= Christopher Finch-Hatton, 16th Earl of Winchilsea =

British peer

The Earl of Winchilsea
- Predecessor: Christopher Finch-Hatton
- Successor: Daniel Finch-Hatton
- Born: Christopher Denys Stormonte Finch-Hatton; 17 November 1936
- Died: 26 June 1999 (aged 62); South Cadbury, Somerset, England
- Spouse: Shirley Hatfield (m. 1962)
- Issue: Daniel Finch-Hatton, 17th Earl of Winchilsea; Lady Alice Finch-Hatton
- Parents: Christopher Finch-Hatton, 15th Earl of Winchilsea; Countess Gladys Széchényi Sárvár-Felsövidék

Christopher Denys Stormonte Finch-Hatton (17 November 1936 – 26 June 1999) was the 16th Earl of Winchilsea and 11th Earl of Nottingham as well as a member of the American Vanderbilt family through his maternal grandmother, Gladys Moore Vanderbilt. He acceded to the titles in 1950 on the death of his father, Christopher Finch-Hatton, 15th Earl of Winchilsea.

== Early life ==
Finch-Hatton was born to Christopher Finch-Hatton, 15th Earl of Winchilsea and Countess Gladys Széchényi Sárvár-Felsövidék. Finch-Hatton's paternal grandparents were Guy Finch-Hatton, 14th Earl of Winchilsea and Margaretta Armstrong Drexel, the daughter of banker Anthony Joseph Drexel of Philadelphia and a survivor of the SS Athenia. His middle name was inspired by his great-uncle, renowned big game hunter Denys Finch-Hatton.

Finch-Hatton's maternal grandparents were Count László Széchényi Sárvár-Felsövidék and Gladys Moore Vanderbilt. Vanderbilt was the seventh and youngest child of Alice Claypoole Gwynne and Cornelius Vanderbilt II, the president and chairman of the New York Central Railroad. Gladys grew up in the family home on Fifth Avenue in New York City, and their summer "cottage," The Breakers in Newport, Rhode Island. Together, Finch-Hatton's parents had two sons before divorcing in 1946:

1. Christopher Denys Stormont Finch-Hatton, 16th Earl of Winchilsea, (1936–1999)
2. The Honourable Robin Heneage Finch-Hatton (1939–2018)

On 17 June 1946, his father married for the second time to Agnes Mary Conroy, daughter of Patrick Joseph Conroy.

=== Education ===
Finch-Hatton attended Eton College then Gordonstoun in Moray, Scotland. At the age of 13, he inherited the titles of Earl of Winchilsea and Nottingham upon the death of his father.

== Career ==
After his National Service in the Royal Navy, he moved to the United States and spent some years living, and occasionally working, there when he was in his twenties and was purported to have retained a great love of people and things American all his life.

After his marriage and return to England, Winchilsea was persuaded to take his seat in the House of Lords to give Liberalism the political representation which had been lacking in the Commons. He sat in the House of Lords as a Liberal Democrat peer for over 20 years. It was said that he was delighted when his home constituency was won by the Liberal Democrats in 1997.

=== Sahrawi ===
He is known for his work promoting the interests of the displaced Sahrawi people. Since 1975, the Sahrawi people were living in refugee camps near Tindouf, in the Algerian part of the Sahara Desert, waiting for a resolution of the decolonisation process in the Spanish Sahara. Spain had allowed the Moroccans to annexe their ex-colony, however, most of the native population fled rather than accept a fait accompli. In 1987, he publicly denounced the King of Morocco's state visit to Britain, and got the ex-US President Jimmy Carter, and through him James Baker, former Secretary of State, involved in the process of reaching a settlement of the Western Sahara conflict under the auspices of the United Nations.

Finch-Hatton helped found, organise and to promote the Sahrawi Refugee Aid Trust in the United Kingdom, resulting in over 10 Rainbow Rover convoys. The convoys were made up of Land Rovers, painted in rainbow colours, and took much-needed medical and food supplies to the camps.

== Personal life ==
In 1962, Finch-Hatton married Shirley Hatfield and bought South Cadbury House in south-east Somerset and committed themselves to improving the house and grounds. Together they had:

1. Daniel Finch-Hatton, 17th Earl of Winchilsea (born 1967), who married Shelley Amanda Gillard
2. Lady Alice Nan Christine Finch-Hatton (born 1970)

Finch-Hatton died on 26 June 1999 and his son Daniel Finch-Hatton inherited his titles including the seat in the House of Lords. However, his son lost this seat in 1999 when the House of Lords Act was implemented. He was buried at Church of St Thomas à Becket near South Cadbury House.

== Styles ==
- 1936–1939: The Honourable Christopher Denys Stormont Finch-Hatton
- 1939–1950: Viscount Maidstone
- 1950–1999: The Right Honourable The Earl of Winchilsea and Earl of Nottingham

== Ancestry ==
Ancestors of Christopher Finch-Hatton, 16th Earl of Winchilsea

8. Henry Stormont Finch-Hatton, 13th Earl of Winchilsea
4. Guy Finch-Hatton, 14th Earl of Winchilsea
9. Anne Codrington
2. Christopher Finch-Hatton, 15th Earl of Winchilsea
10. Anthony Joseph Drexel Jr.
5. Margaretta Armstrong Drexel
11. Margarita Armstrong
1. Christopher Denys Stormont Finch-Hatton, 16th Earl of Winchilsea
12. Count Imre Széchenyi de Sárvár-Felsővidék
6. Count László Széchenyi de Sárvár-Felsővidék
13. Countess Alexandra Sztáray de Sztára et Nagymihály
3. Countess Gladys Széchényi de Sárvár-Felsővidék
14. Cornelius Vanderbilt II
7. Gladys Vanderbilt
15. Alice Gwynne

== See also ==
- Guy Finch-Hatton, 14th Earl of Winchilsea
- Christopher Finch-Hatton, 15th Earl of Winchilsea
- Daniel Finch-Hatton, 17th Earl of Winchilsea

Peerage of England
Preceded by Christopher Finch-Hatton	Earl of Winchilsea; 1950–1999	Succeeded by Daniel Finch-Hatton
Preceded by Christopher Finch-Hatton	Earl of Nottingham; 7th creation 1950–1999	Succeeded by Daniel Finch-Hatton
