= Christopher Finch-Hatton, 15th Earl of Winchilsea =

15th Earl of Winchilsea and 10th Earl of Nottingham

The Right Honourable The Earl of Winchilsea
- Predecessor: Guy Finch-Hatton
- Successor: Christopher Finch-Hatton
- Born: Christopher Guy Heneage Finch-Hatton; 2 August 1911
- Died: 7 March 1950 (aged 38)
- Noble family: Finch-Hatton
- Spouses: Countess Gladys Széchényi (m. 1935; div. 1945) Agnes Mary Conroy (m. 1946)
- Issue: Christopher Finch-Hatton, 16th Earl of Winchilsea; Hon. Robin Heneage Finch-Hatton
- Parents: Guy Finch-Hatton, 14th Earl of Winchilsea; Margaretta Armstrong Drexel

Christopher Guy Heneage Finch-Hatton (2 August 1911 – 7 March 1950) was the 15th Earl of Winchilsea and 10th Earl of Nottingham. He acceded to the titles in 1939 on the death of his father, Guy Finch-Hatton, 14th Earl of Winchilsea. His mother was Margaretta Armstrong Drexel, the daughter of banker Anthony Joseph Drexel of Philadelphia.

== Early life ==
Finch-Hatton was born on 2 August 1911 to Guy Finch-Hatton, 14th Earl of Winchilsea (1885–1939) and his wife American heiress Margaretta Armstrong Drexel (1885–1952). His paternal grandfather was Henry Stormont Finch-Hatton, 13th Earl of Winchilsea (1852–1927), and his great-grandfather was Admiral Sir Henry Codrington (1808–1877), a captain who provided refuge on board ship for Leopold II, Grand Duke of Tuscany and his family who were fleeing from revolutionary forces and then commanded HMS Royal George in the Baltic Sea during the Crimean War. Codrington went on to be Admiral superintendent of Malta Dockyard and then Commander-in-Chief, Plymouth.

His uncle was Hon. Denys Finch-Hatton, while his sister was Lady Daphne Finch-Hatton who married Whitney Straight.

His maternal grandfather was banker Anthony J. Drexel Jr. (1864–1934) of Philadelphia, and his great-grandfather was Anthony Joseph Drexel (1826–1893), the founder of Drexel, Morgan & Co., along with J. P. Morgan, in New York in 1871, as well as the founder of Drexel University in 1891.

== Personal life ==
On 10 July 1935, he married fellow half-American, Countess Gladys Széchényi Sárvár-Felsövidék (1913–1978), daughter of Count László Széchényi Sárvár-Felsövidék (1879–1938) and Gladys Moore Vanderbilt (1886–1965). Vanderbilt was the seventh and youngest child of Alice Claypoole Gwynne (1845–1934) and Cornelius Vanderbilt II (1843–1899), the president and chairman of the New York Central Railroad, and grew up in the family home on Fifth Avenue in New York City, and their summer "cottage," The Breakers (built in 1893) in Newport, Rhode Island. Before divorcing in March 1945, Finch-Hatton and Széchenyi had two sons:

- Christopher Denys Stormont Finch-Hatton, 16th Earl of Winchilsea (1936–1999), who in 1962 married Shirley Hatfield, daughter of Bernard Hatfield.
- Hon. Robin Heneage Finch-Hatton (1939-2018), who in 1962 married Molly Iona Powell, daughter of Colonel Palgrave Dawson Turner Powell.

On 17 June 1946, he married for the second time to Agnes Mary Conroy, daughter of Patrick Joseph Conroy at the Corpus Christi Church in London. He died on 7 March 1950 at age 38 and was succeeded by his son Christopher.

== See also ==
- Guy Finch-Hatton, 14th Earl of Winchilsea
- Christopher Finch-Hatton, 16th Earl of Winchilsea
- Daniel Finch-Hatton, 17th Earl of Winchilsea

Peerage of England
Preceded by Guy Finch-Hatton	Earl of Winchilsea; 1939–1950	Succeeded by Christopher Denys Stormont Finch-Hatton
Preceded by Guy Finch-Hatton	Earl of Nottingham; 7th creation 1939–1950	Succeeded by Christopher Denys Stormont Finch-Hatton
