= Margaretta Finch-Hatton, Countess of Winchilsea =

American heiress who married into the English aristocracy

The Right Honourable The Countess of Winchilsea and Nottingham
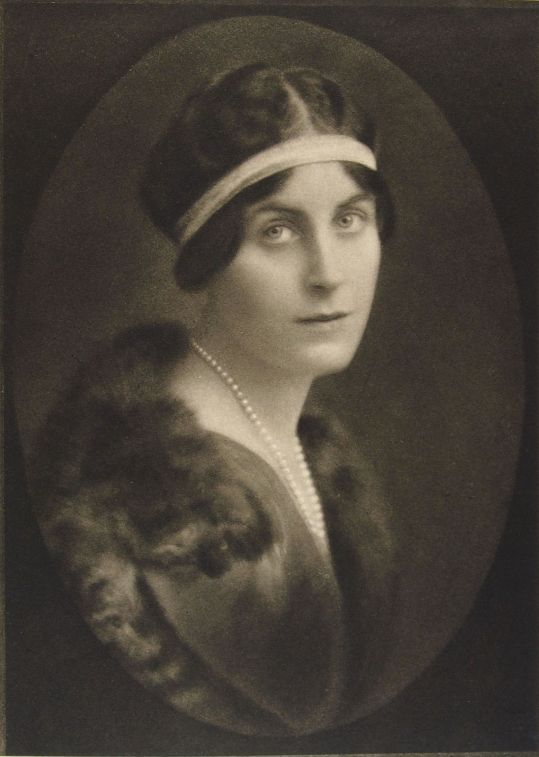
- Photograph of Viscountess Maidstone, 1922

Personal details
- Born: Margaretta Armstrong Drexel; 1 March 1885 Philadelphia, Pennsylvania, U.S.
- Died: 22 December 1952 (aged 67) London, England
- Spouse: Guy Finch-Hatton, 14th Earl of Winchilsea (m. 1910; died 1939)
- Relations: Anthony Joseph Drexel (grandfather); John Armstrong Drexel (brother); Anthony Joseph Drexel III (brother)
- Children: Christopher Finch-Hatton; Daphne Finch-Hatton; Henrietta Finch-Hatton
- Parent(s): Margarita Armstrong Drexel; Anthony Joseph Drexel Jr.

Margaretta Armstrong Finch-Hatton, Countess of Winchilsea and Nottingham (née Drexel) (1 March 1885 – 22 December 1952) was an American heiress who married into the English aristocracy.

== Early life ==
Margaretta was born in 1885 into a wealthy Philadelphia banking dynasty. She was the daughter of Margarita (née Armstrong) Drexel and Anthony Joseph Drexel Jr. Her brothers Anthony Joseph Drexel III and John Armstrong Drexel were also bankers (John was a partner in the securities firm of William P. Bonbright & Co. of London and New York along with her husband). In 1917, her parents divorced and, the following year, her mother married Brinsley FitzGerald (the son of Peter FitzGerald, 1st Baronet of Valencia) in 1918.

Her paternal grandfather was Anthony Joseph Drexel, son of Francis M. Drexel and her maternal grandfather was John Armstrong of the Baltimore Armstrongs.

Margaretta was presented at court in 1908 by Princess Louise Margaret of Prussia, the Duchess of Connaught. Reportedly, after her presentation at court, she "at once attained great popularity in London society, she became the most highly sought-after debutante that season. Her modesty and simple, easy manners, attracted many proposals. Among her reported suitors were Prince Christopher, sixth son of King George of Greece; Prince Francis of Teck; and Prince Francis Joseph, second son of the Duke and Duchess of Braganza, whose eldest brother Prince Miguel, had married Margaretta's first cousin through their mothers, Miss Anita Stewart, Princess de Braganza."

== Personal life ==
On 8 June 1910, Margaretta was married to Guy Finch-Hatton, Viscount Maidstone by the Bishop of London at St Margaret's, Westminster by the Bishop of London. The reception was held at the Drexel home in 22 Grosvenor Square attended by 1,500 guests. Her wedding gifts alone (including a long diamond cable chain from J. P. Morgan) was estimated to have a total value of $243,000 ($ 8.3 million). Her annuity from her father trusts was estimated at $100,000 a year, she also inherited a lump sump of $1,000,000 ($ 34 million).

He was the son of Henry Finch-Hatton, 13th Earl of Winchilsea and the former Anne "Nan" Jane Codrington. His two siblings were Gladys Finch-Hatton (who married Capt. Osmond Williams, a son of Sir Osmond Williams, 1st Baronet) and Denys Finch Hatton, a noted big-game hunter. Together, Guy and Margaretta were the parents of three children:

- Christopher Finch-Hatton, 15th Earl of Winchilsea (1911–1950), who married Countess Gladys Széchényi Sárvár-Felsövidék, daughter of Count László Széchényi Sárvár-Felsövidék, of the Polish noble Széchényi family, and Gladys Vanderbilt Széchenyi, a member of the American Vanderbilt family. They divorced in 1945 and he married Agnes Mary Conroy in 1946.
- Lady Daphne Margarita Finch-Hatton (1913–2003), who married Whitney Straight (1912–1979), a member of the old Whitney family, in 1935.
- Lady Henrietta Diana Juanita Finch-Hatton (1917–1977), who married Peter Frank Tiarks (1910–1975).

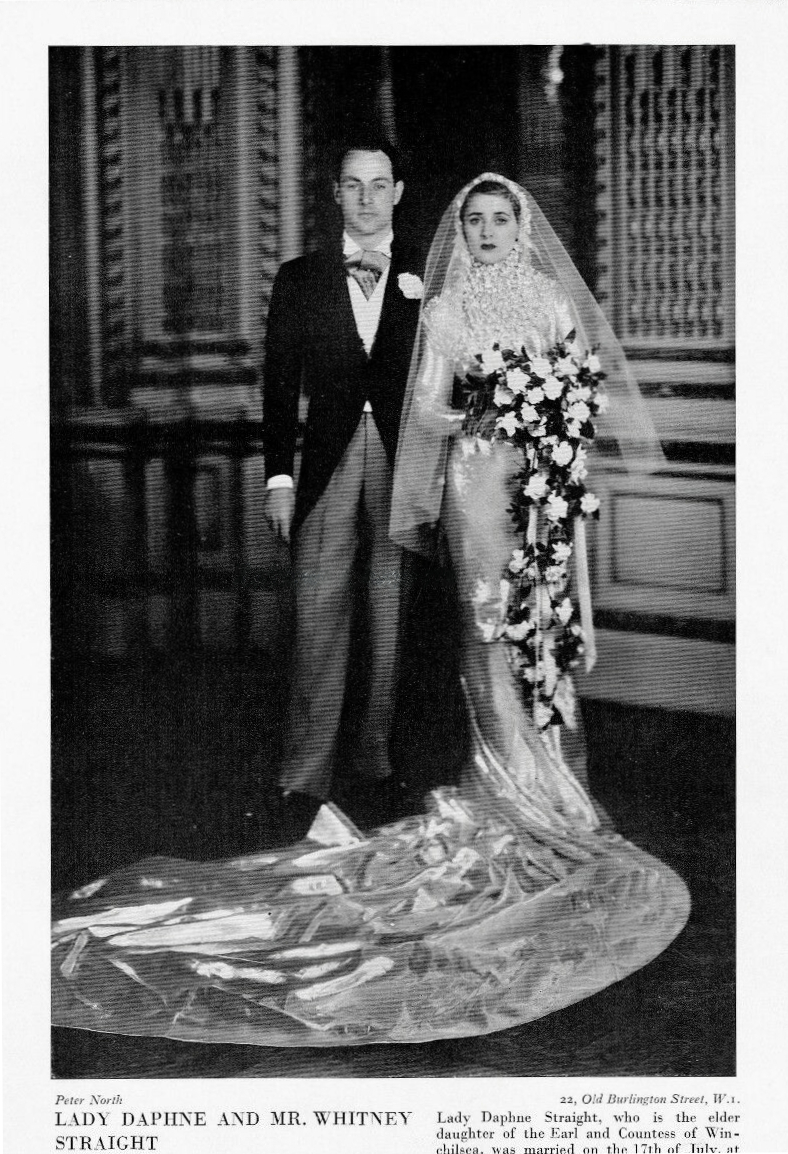
Her daughter Lady Daphne Finch-Hatton (1913–2003) with her husband, Whitney Straight

They lived with Margaretta's parents at 22 Grosvenor Square until her parents separated in 1912, then they moved to 19 Grosvenor Street.

In 1926 Guy (Toby) and Margaretta purchased their new country home, then named Buckfield House, at Sherfield-on-Loddon in Hampshire. The house was renovated and contained many amenities fit for aristocrat and social elites.

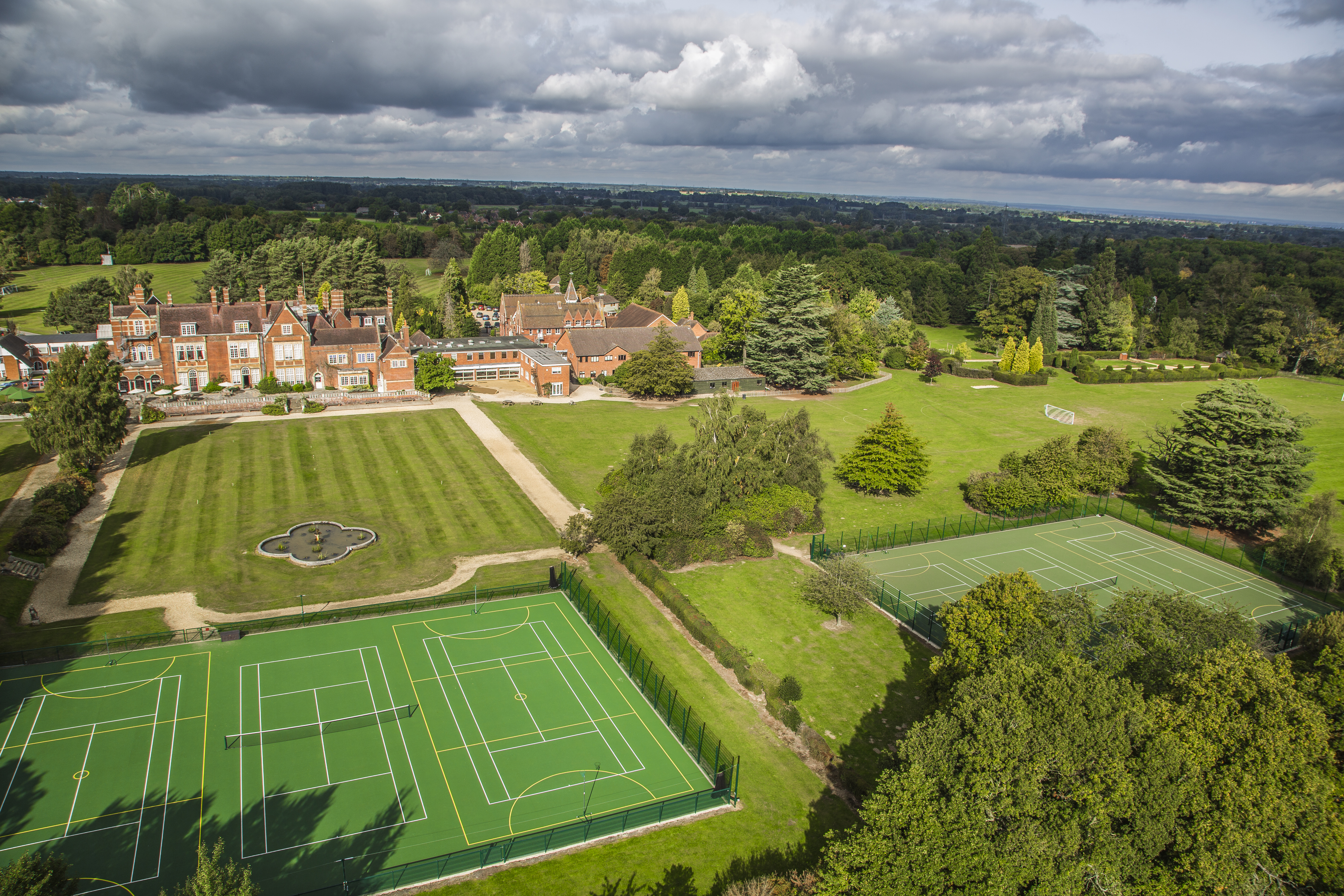
Buckfield House (Now Sherfield School)

In 1927, upon the death of his father, her husband became the 14th Earl of Winchilsea and 9th Earl of Nottingham, and Margaretta became known as the Countess of Winchilsea and Nottingham.

Margaretta became a leader of Britain's Women's Land Army which trained 25,000 women to replace British farmers who had been called up for active service. At this time, she also gave Buckfield over to become a nurses home and two years after the war (1947) she sold the house. it became a private school for girls and was renamed North Foreland Lodge.

Lord Winchilsea died in London on 10 February 1939. In September 1939, Lady Winchilsea survived the sinking of the S.S. Athenia, which was torpedoed by a German U-boat. Lady Winchilsea died in London in 1952.
