= Whitney Straight =

Royal Air Force Air Commodore (1912–1979)

Air Commodore Whitney Straight CBE MC DFC FRSA FRGS
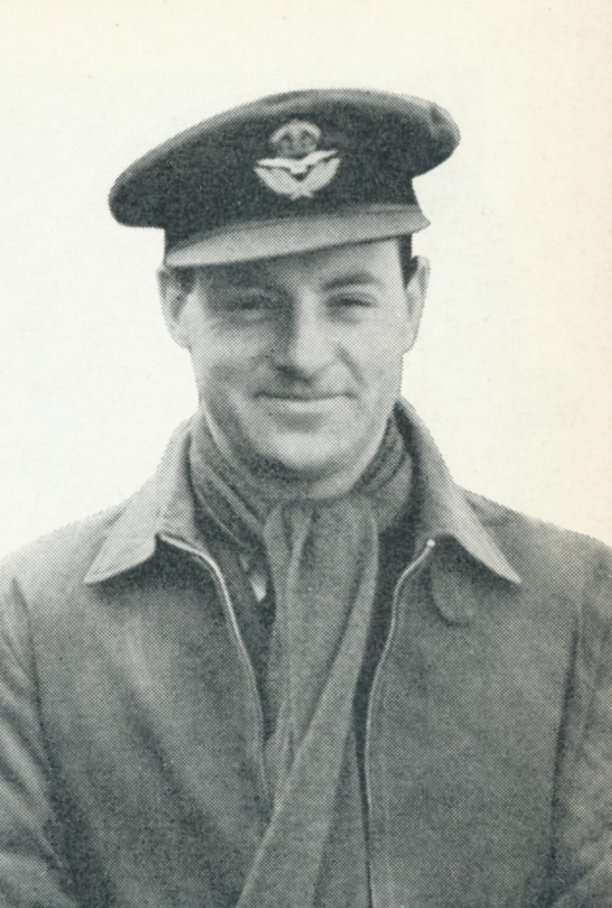

Personal details
- Born: 6 November 1912 New York City, United States
- Died: 5 April 1979 (aged 66) London, England
- Spouse: Lady Daphne Finch-Hatton (m. 1935)
- Parents: Willard Dickerman Straight (father); Dorothy Payne Whitney (mother)
- Relatives: Beatrice Straight (sister); Michael Straight (brother)
- Education: Trinity College, Cambridge
- Known for: Chairman, Royal Aero Club; Managing Director and CEO, British Overseas Airways Corporation; Deputy Chairman, Rolls-Royce

Military service
- Allegiance: United Kingdom
- Branch/service: Royal Air Force
- Years of service: 1939–1945
- Rank: Air Commodore
- Unit: No. 601 Squadron RAF
- Battles/wars: Second World War: Norwegian Campaign; Battle of Britain
- Awards: Commander of the Order of the British Empire; Military Cross; Distinguished Flying Cross; Mentioned in Despatches; War Cross with Sword (Norway); Officer of the Legion of Merit (United States)

Air Commodore Whitney Willard Straight, CBE, MC, DFC, FRSA, FRGS (6 November 1912 – 5 April 1979), was a British racing driver, aviator, businessman, and a member of the prominent Whitney family.

== Early life ==
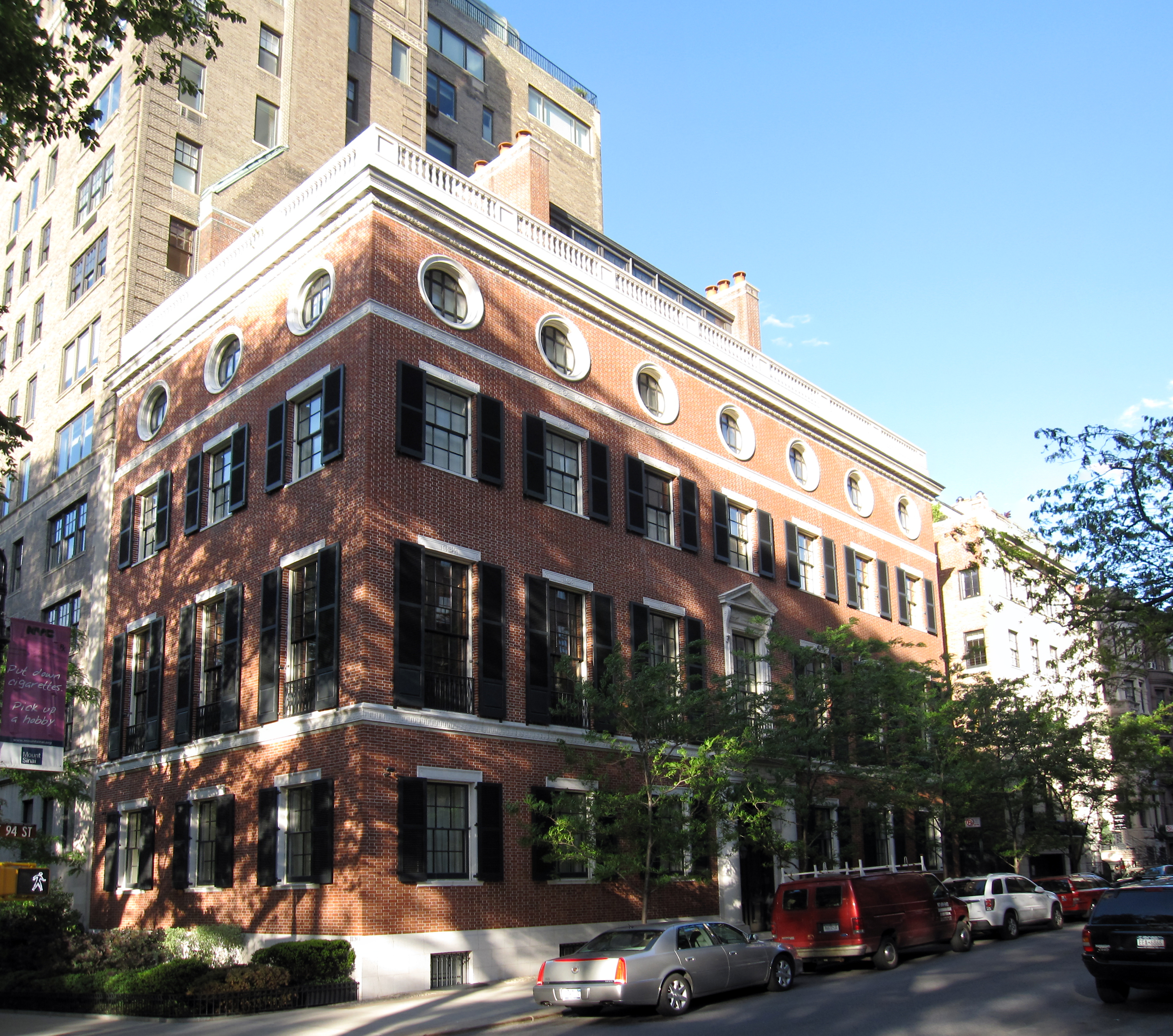
Willard D. Straight House, 1130 Fifth Avenue, New York

Born in New York City, Whitney Straight was the son of Major Willard Dickerman Straight (1880–1918) and one of the richest heiresses Dorothy Payne Whitney (1887–1968), daughter of William Collins Whitney who inherited $15,000,000 from her father. He was six years old when his father died in France of influenza during the great epidemic while serving with the United States Army during the First World War. Following his mother's remarriage to British agronomist Leonard K. Elmhirst (1893–1974) in 1925, the family moved to England. They lived at Dartington Hall where he attended the progressive school founded by his parents. His education was completed at Trinity College, Cambridge. He became close friends with Dick Seaman who attended the same college.

Among his relations were his first cousin Jock Whitney, U.S. ambassador to Britain, his uncle-in-law Lord Queenborough and his first cousin the Hon. Dorothy Paget.

== Career ==
=== Motor racing ===
While still an undergraduate at Cambridge, Straight became a well known Grand Prix motor racing driver and competed at events in the UK and Europe. Like a lot of other wealthy young men of his generation, he had passion for motor racing. He competed in more Grands Prix than any American until after the Second World War. Straight started competing in 1931 with a Brooklands Riley competing at Shelsley Walsh, Southport and Brooklands circuit.

In 1933, driving a black and silver Maserati, he won the Mountain Championship at Brooklands, the Mont Ventoux Hill Climb (3 September) and the Brighton Speed Trials (16 September). He also won the 1100 c.c. class in the Coppa Acerbo, held at Pescara, Italy, driving an MG Magnette. In 1934 he formed his own motor racing team, personally driving to victory in the South African Grand Prix, held on the 16-mile Buffalo circuit in East London. His brother Michael finished third in the same race. He also gave public demonstrations at Brooklands Racing Circuit achieving a speed of 138.7 mph, a record for 5-litre class cars. He was offered a works Auto Union drive for 1935, but he refused as he had promised his fiancée Lady Daphne to retire from driving. His last race was the 1934 South African GP, which he won.

=== Flying ===
Flying was also another of his passions. He started flying lessons in 1929, and shortly after his 17th birthday, took his pilot's licence. In his early 20s, as head of the Straight Corporation Limited, he operated airlines and airfields throughout Britain and ran flying clubs. He commissioned an advanced light aircraft, the Hendy Heck, and in 1936 he helped develop the Miles Whitney Straight aircraft, the same year he became a naturalised British citizen. On 18 October 1938, the Straight Corporation purchased control of Norman Edgar (Western Airways) Ltd. and renamed it Western Airways Ltd. His commercial airline business in the later 1930s was reputed to be carrying more passengers than Imperial Airways, on short routes within the UK, flying de Havilland Dragon Rapides.

==== Second World War ====
During the Second World War, Whitney Straight served as a Royal Air Force pilot. He was despatched to Norway in April 1940 to find frozen lakes suitable for use as airfields. Lake Lesjaskog was utilised by No. 263 Squadron RAF during the Norwegian Campaign as a result. Straight was seriously wounded during a German bombing raid in Norway. He was temporarily deaf, because of this he was grounded and appointed personal air assistant ADC to the Prince George, Duke of Kent.

For his service in Norway, he was awarded the Norwegian War Cross with sword in 1942.

After convalescing, he next served with No. 601 Squadron RAF in the Battle of Britain. From September 1940 until April 1941, he was credited with two aircraft destroyed. He then became commanding officer of No. 242 Squadron RAF, bringing his total to 3 and 1 shared ( with 2 'probables') by late July 1941. Early in 1941 he was awarded a Military Cross for his service in Norway.

He was shot down by flak over France on 31 July 1941 and initially evaded capture. Through the French Underground, he made his way to unoccupied Vichy France where he was captured and put in a prisoner-of-war camp. However he escaped on 22 June 1942 and with the aid of the French Resistance reached safety in Gibraltar.

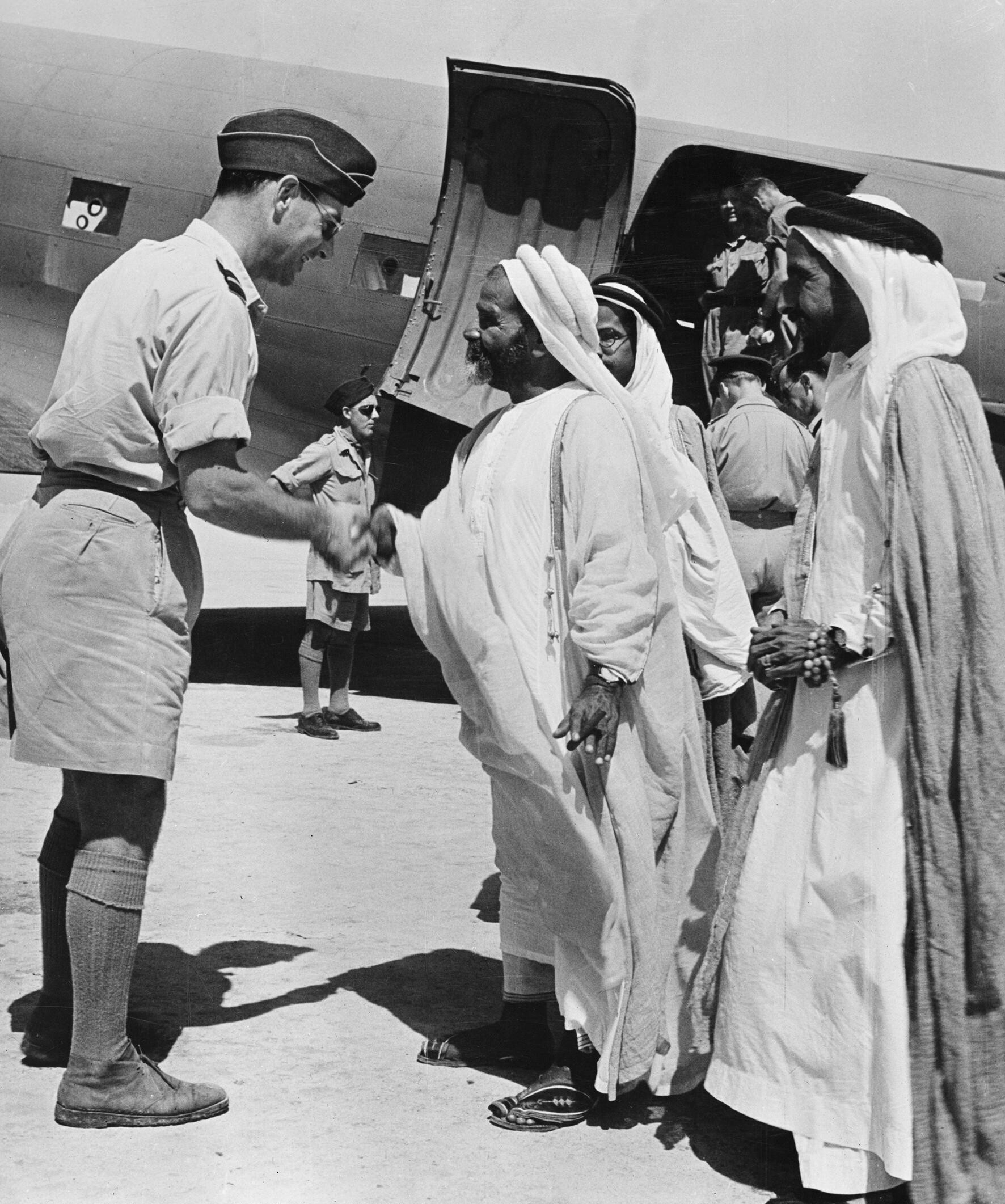
Straight with Sheikh Khalifa, cousin of the ruler of Bahrain, and his two sons, 18 January 1945

In September 1942, now as an air commodore, he was sent to the Middle East joining HQ, No. 216 Group RAF, as Air Officer Commanding.

==== After the war ====
At war's end, he returned to the UK becoming AOC, No. 46 Group in June 1945. He was released from the RAF in late 1945, and he became chairman of the Royal Aero Club. With the establishment of the British European Airways Corporation in 1946, Straight was its deputy chairman. In July 1947, he became managing director and chief executive officer of British Overseas Airways Corporation. In 1949, Straight was appointed deputy chairman of the board. In the United States his cousin, Cornelius Vanderbilt Whitney (1899–1992), was the President of Aviation Corporation of America, which became Pan American Airways.

Around this time he was also on the board of Rolls-Royce and he discovered that in 1947 Rolls-Royce had sold 55 jet engines to the Soviet Union, the sale being approved by the post-war Labour government of Clement Attlee. The Russians had copied the technology to produce their own version of the jet engine and were powering the MiG fighters using Rolls-Royce technology. He decided to sue the Russian government for copyright infringement. The figure claimed was £207 million which he never received.

In 1967, he donated the Whitney Straight Award to the Royal Aeronautical Society to recognise the achievement and status of women in aviation. The award consisted of a cheque and a sculpture by Barbara Hepworth. It was won by Anne Burns in 1967 and Peggy Hodges in 1970.

== Personal life ==
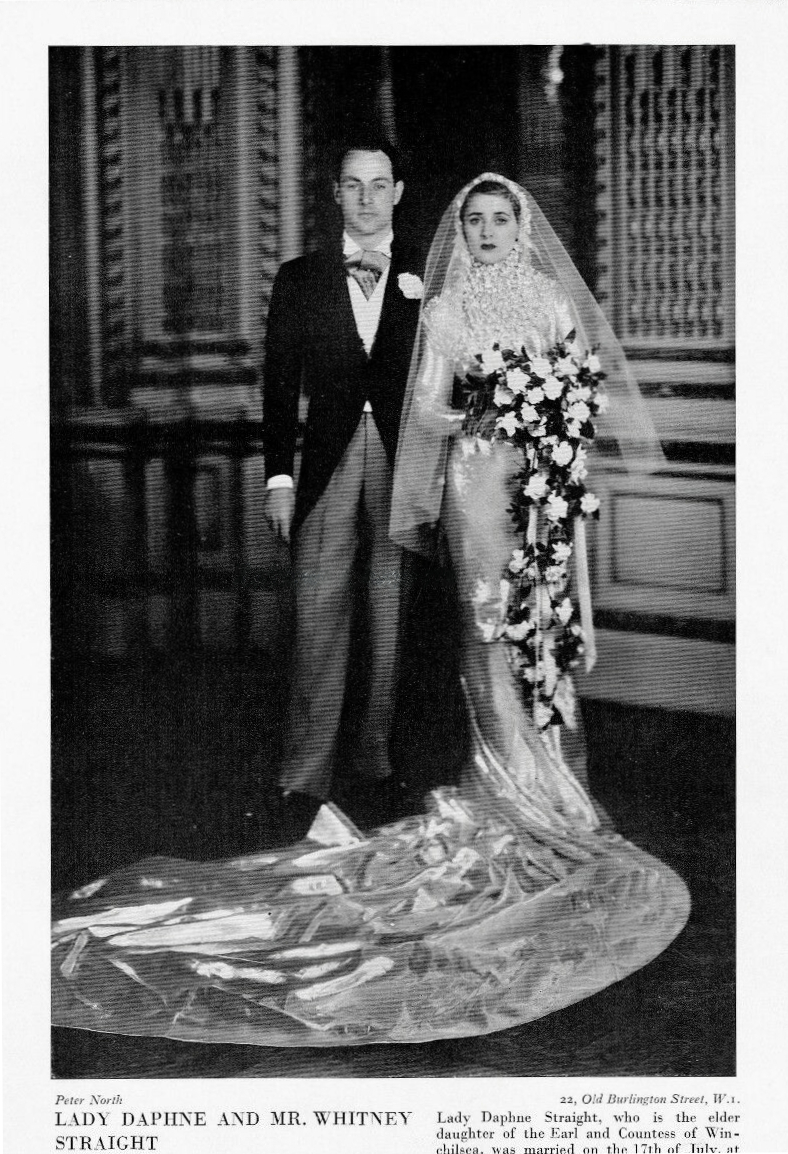
Whitney Straight and Lady Daphne Finch-Hatton (1913–2003)

On 17 July 1935 he married Lady Daphne Margarita Finch-Hatton (1913–2003), elder daughter of Guy Finch-Hatton, the 14th Earl of Winchilsea (1885–1939) and American heiress Margaretta Armstrong Drexel (1885–1952). Lady Daphne's paternal uncle was Denys Finch Hatton (1887–1931), a famous pilot who was involved with Beryl Markham (1902–1986), another British pilot. Lady Daphne was half-American as her mother, Margaretta, was the daughter of Anthony Joseph Drexel, Jr. (1864–1934) and the granddaughter of Anthony Joseph Drexel (1826–1893), all from Philadelphia, Pennsylvania. Lady Daphne's maternal uncles included Anthony J. Drexel II, who married Marjorie Gould, daughter of George Jay Gould, and John Armstrong Drexel (1891–1958), who was also an aviation pioneer. Daphne was also a 4-times great niece of Jane Austen, through her brother Edward Austen Knight.

Air Cdre Whitney and Lady Daphne Straight had two daughters:

- Camilla Caroline Straight, who on 22 June 1960, married Michael Ian Vansittart Bowater (b. 1934) (the son of Lt. Col. Sir Ian Bowater (1904–1982) and the Hon. Ursula Margaret Dawson (1907–1999)). Sir Ian and Lady Bowater had 4 daughters.
- Amanda Straight, who in 1991, married James Opinsky.

After his colleague died in a car crash, he promised his fiancée Lady Daphne Finch-Hatton that he would quit racing, and never raced again after that.

=== Personality ===
He was handsome, normally of a quiet and courteous disposition, Straight nonetheless had one dislike, he hated allusions to his wealth. He especially resented the way newspapers sensationalized him as "Boy Millionaire Race Track Idol". One columnist quoted Whitney as saying "I often wish I never had a fortune. It is difficult to make real friends and nobody appreciates you at your true worth".

In an attempt to prove his own value to himself, he once temporarily abandoned luxury and rode out into the English countryside on an outdated motorcycle with just a few shillings in his pocket. He claimed to have worked as a stonemason's labourer for 30/-a week for a time while acting as a mechanised hobo. However, it appears that there were times when even this modest competence overcame him. In the summer of 1933, for example, when he was just beginning to lose his shine on names like Birkin and Campbell, he admitted he was considering giving up everything he owned and spending the rest of his life in a monastery, but Straight's qualities as a driver were genuine.

=== Relationship with Diana Barnato Walker ===
While Straight was married to Lady Daphne, he had an affair with noted aviator Diana Barnato Walker, the first British woman to break the sound barrier. Diana was the daughter of Woolf Barnato (1895–1948), another famous racing driver, and the widow of Wing Commander Derek Ronald Walker, who was killed on 14 November 1945 in bad weather while flying. Together, Whitney and Diana had a son, Barney Barnato Walker (born 1947).

=== Death ===
Straight died at Fulham in 1979 at the age of 66. Lady Daphne died at her home in London on 3 June 2003, and Diana died on 28 April 2008, aged 90.
