= Brinsley FitzGerald =

Anglo-Irish stockbroker

- Born: 25 September 1859
- Died: 9 February 1931 (aged 71)
- Education: Rugby School
- Alma mater: University College, Oxford
- Occupation: Stockbroker
- Spouse: Margaretta Armstrong Drexel
- Parent(s): Sir Peter FitzGerald; Julia Hussey

Lieutenant-Colonel Brinsley FitzGerald, CB (25 September 1859 – 9 February 1931) was an Anglo-Irish stockbroker.

== Early life ==
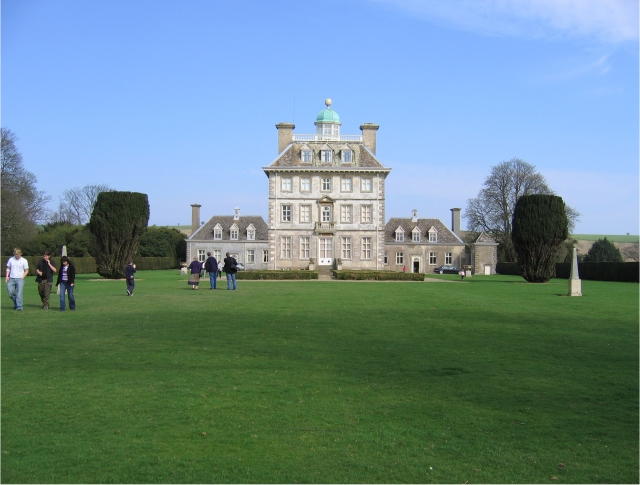
Ashdown House, viewed from the west

Brinsley FitzGerald was born on 25 September 1859, the fourth son of Sir Peter FitzGerald, 1st Baronet of Valencia, 19th Knight of Kerry (1808–1880) and Julia Hussey. He was educated at Rugby School and University College, Oxford.

== Career ==
FitzGerald worked as a land agent in Ireland for seven years, and from 1895 until 1918 was a member of the London Stock Exchange, with the firm of Basil Montgomery FitzGerald and Co.

He was appointed a second-lieutenant in the West Somerset Yeomanry on 18 January 1900. Following the outbreak of the Second Boer War in late 1899, he had volunteered for active service and was attached as a lieutenant to the 25th Company of the 7th Battalion, Imperial Yeomanry, on 24 February 1900. The company left the United Kingdom for South Africa in the SS Mahratta in early March 1900. After arrival, FitzGerald served with the company, and later as ADC to General French, for which he was mentioned in despatches and awarded the Queen's Medal with six clasps. He also served during the European War as private secretary to French in 1914, for which he was awarded the CB (in 1916), the Legion d'Honneur and the Order of Leopold.

== Personal life ==
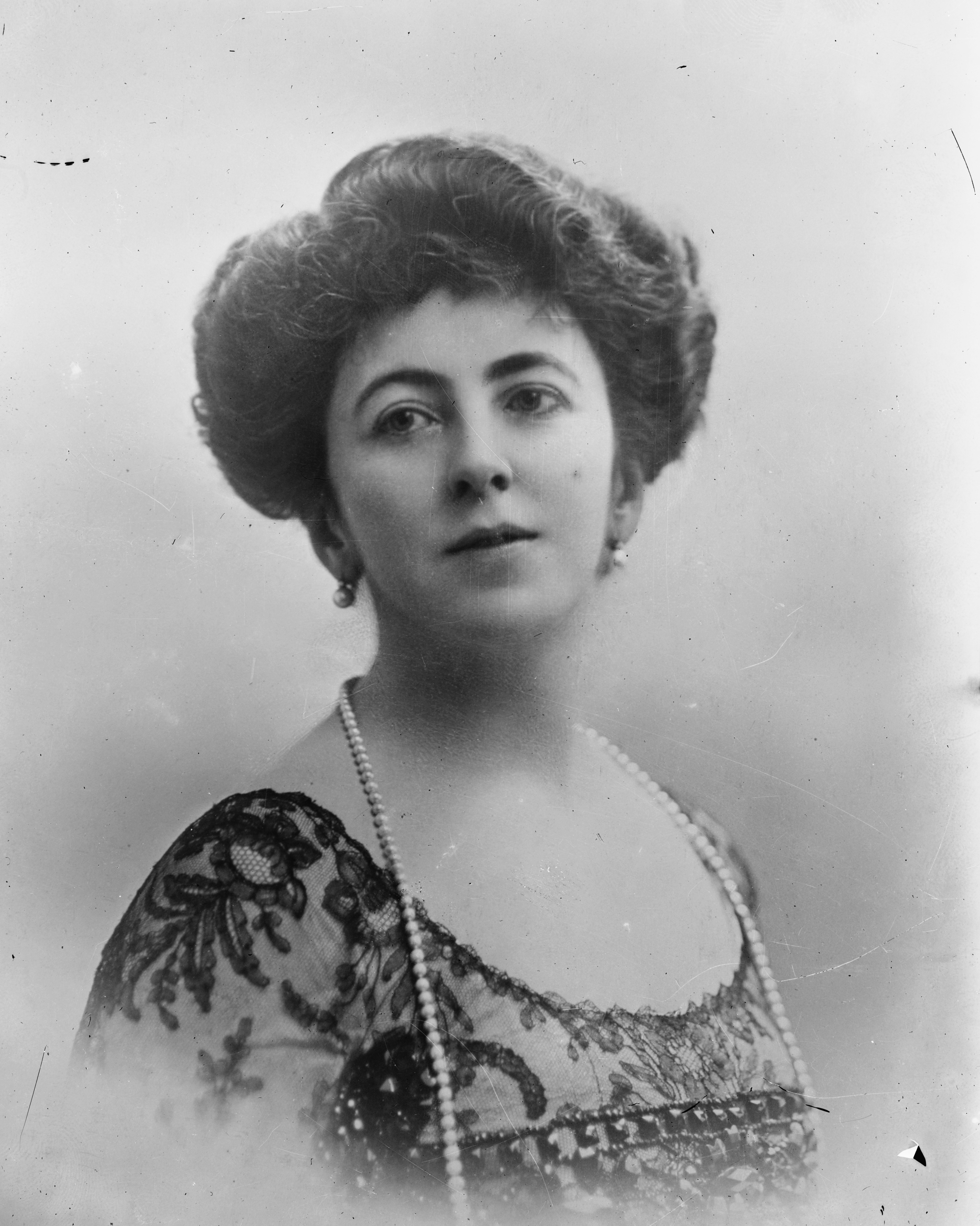
Margarita Armstrong

In 1918, he married Margarita (née Armstrong) Drexel (1867–1948), the former wife of banker Anthony Joseph Drexel Jr., son of banker Anthony Joseph Drexel (1826–1893). Margaretta and Drexel were married from 1886 until their divorce in 1917, seven months before she wed FitzGerald. Brinsley and Margarita did not have any children, however, Drexel had four children from her previous marriage: Margaretta Drexel (the wife of Guy Finch-Hatton, 14th Earl of Winchilsea); Anthony Joseph Drexel II (who married Marjorie Gould, eldest daughter of George Jay Gould I); John Armstrong Drexel, aviation pioneer; and Louis Clapier Norris Drexel (who married Nancy Grayson, daughter of Sir Henry Grayson, 1st Baronet).

FitzGerald lived at Ashdown Park, Ashbury, Swindon, and was a member of White's and the Royal Yacht Squadron, Cowes. He died on 9 February 1931.
