= USS Narada =

Patrol vessel of the United States Navy

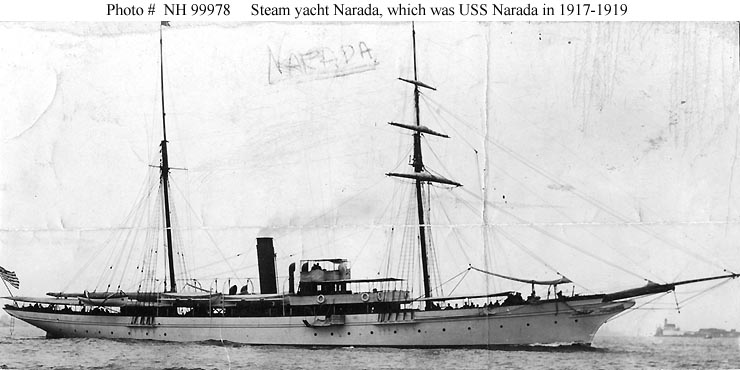
- Narada as a civilian steam yacht before her US Navy service

History

United States
- Name: USS Narada
- Namesake: Narada
- Builder: Ramage & Ferguson, Leith
- Launched: 30 May 1889
- Completed: 1889
- Acquired: 30 June 1917
- Commissioned: 12 October 1917
- Decommissioned: 13 January 1919
- Fate: Returned to owner 4 February 1919
- Notes: Operated as private steam yacht Semiramis, Margarita, and Narada 1889–1917 and as Narada from 1919; In commercial use until the late 1930s

General characteristics
- Type: Patrol vessel
- Tonnage: 505 GRT
- Length: 224.0 ft (68.3 m) overall; 206.5 ft (62.9 m) registered
- Beam: 27.15 ft (8.28 m)
- Draft: 15 ft 9 in (4.80 m)
- Depth: 14.6 ft (4.5 m)
- Installed power: 127 NHP
- Propulsion: 1 × triple-expansion engine; 1 × screw
- Speed: 12 knots (22 km/h)

USS Narada (SP-161) was an 1889 Scottish-built steam yacht, originally Semiramis and later named Margarita, that served in the United States Navy as a patrol vessel from 1917 to 1919.

== Semiramis and Margarita ==
The steam yacht Semiramis was built by Ramage & Ferguson at Victoria Shipyard, Leith, Scotland as Yard No.93. She was launched on 30 May 1889 as Semiramis, the legendary ruler of Assyria, for John Lysaght of Bristol, a steel company owner, who had previously bought two smaller yachts from the same shipyard. Her steel hull had a length of 224.0 feet (68.3 m) overall and 206.4 feet (62.9 m) between perpendiculars, a beam of 27.1 feet (8.3 m) and a draft of 15.8 feet (4.8 m). She measured 491 GRT and 272 NRT and was powered by a 725-indicated-horsepower (541 kW) triple expansion steam engine, made by the shipbuilder and driving a single screw. Semiramis entered service on 3 July 1889, after running trials in the Firth of Forth, and was registered at the port of Leith, with British Official Number 95213.

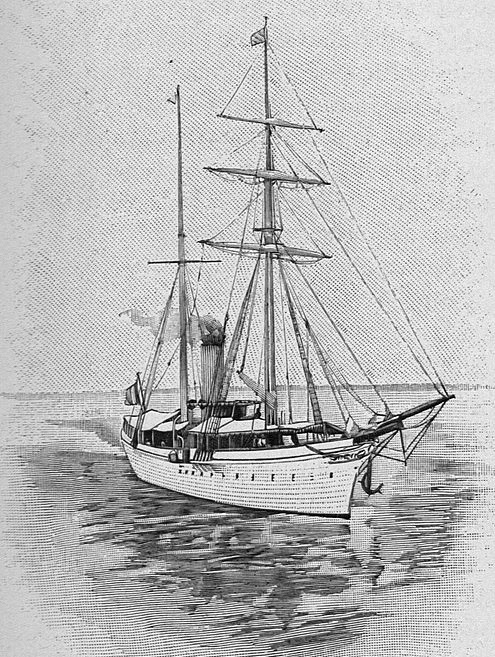
Semiramis in the Indian Ocean 1893

In September 1892, John Lysaght returned to Ramage & Ferguson and ordered an even larger yacht, named Cleopatra, and sold Semiramis. The French buyer was widow Mme. Amicie Lebaudy, whose youngest son, Max Lebaudy (1873–1895), had become a millionaire aged 19. In an attempt to lure him away from Paris and extravagant expenditure founded on debt, she planned a long cruise, in the company of a young scientist, Louis Lapicque; the son refused to go, and Semiramis eventually sailed for the Indian Ocean without him in November 1892. Lapicque's ethnological studies of the Andaman negritos were successfully completed.

Early in 1894 the yacht was purchased by Anthony Joseph Drexel Jr. who changed the name to Margarita, in honor of his spouse.

== Narada and World War I ==
She was later renamed Narada. The U.S. Navy purchased Narada from her owner, Mr. Henry D. Walters of Baltimore, Maryland, on 30 June 1917 for use as a patrol vessel during World War I. She was commissioned on 12 October 1917 as USS Narada (SP-161).

During her entire period of naval service, Narada was based at New London, Connecticut, for experimental submarine signal work.

After completion of this service, Narada departed for New York City, arriving there on 13 January 1919. She was decommissioned the same day and returned to her owner on 4 February 1919.

== Other sources ==
- US Naval History and Heritage Command, photos of Narada
- Photo gallery of USS Narada at NavSource Naval History
