= North Foreland Lodge =

Defunct boarding school for girls in England

Coordinates: 51°18′32″N 1°1′26″W

- Originally at North Foreland, Isle of Thanet, Kent; from 1947 at Sherfield on Loddon, Hampshire, RG27; England

Information
- Type: Independent
- Motto: Latin: Bene agere ac laetari (To do good and be happy)
- Religious affiliation: Church of England
- Established: 1909
- Founder: Mary B. Wolseley-Lewis
- Closed: 2003

North Foreland Lodge was a private boarding school for girls in England, originally established at North Foreland in Kent. Displaced from there by the Second World War, in 1947 it settled at Sherfield Manor in Sherfield on Loddon, Hampshire, until its closure in 2003 shortly after being acquired by another school, Gordonstoun.

In 2004 Gordonstoun sold the school site to a group of schools called Gems Education (an international company which runs schools in the Middle East), which converted it into a new mixed-sex independent school called Sherfield School.

== History ==
The school was founded in 1909 at North Foreland, near Broadstairs in Kent, by Mary Wolseley-Lewis, who at the time was the head of the Francis Holland School in Graham Street, Westminster, SW1. This event came as a shock to the Francis Holland School, especially when its departing head took several girls and members of staff with her. Miss Wolseley-Lewis had herself been educated by Dorothea Beale at Cheltenham Ladies College.

The Journal of Education reported on the opening of the school:

A NEW school for girls is to be opened on the North Foreland in May. The soundness of the Church teaching is obviously guaranteed, no less by the appointment of Miss Wolseley-Lewis as Principal than by the three bishops who are among the patrons. The social position seems to be equally well secured by the fee of one hundred and fifty guineas together with the fact that, according to the advertisement, "references will, in all cases, be required".

As a result of the Second World War, the school had to evacuate its premises in Kent, and it then had several temporary homes, including a hotel. After the War, in 1947, the school bought as a permanent home Sherfield Manor, which during the War had served as a military hospital, and continued to occupy it for more than fifty years, extending the buildings to more than 125,000 sq ft (11,600 m^{2}).

On 3 December 1981 Queen Margrethe II of Denmark, who had been educated at North Foreland Lodge in the 1950s, opened the school's new music wing.

By 1982 there were 160 girls, all of whom were boarders. The core curriculum consisted of English, French, mathematics, history, geography, biology, chemistry, physics, and religious knowledge. Other subjects taught included Latin, Italian, Russian, Spanish, classical studies, history of art, music, sociology, and computer studies. About half of the girls learnt a musical instrument, and the main school sports were lacrosse, gymnastics, tennis, netball, swimming, and rounders. By 1989 overall numbers were up to 189, with fifty girls in the sixth form.

In 1995, North Foreland Lodge was reported to be one of the few schools willing to accommodate pet rabbits. A charge of £2 per rabbit per term was made for sawdust and straw.

In the year 2000, the school was in the news when it was revealed that J. K. Rowling had given permission for its girls to perform a dramatisation of her Harry Potter and the Philosopher's Stone, and was in the news again two weeks later when Rowling changed her mind at the last minute, after realising that this would be a world premiere. Rowling arranged a personal visit to the school by way of apology. Headmistress Susan Cameron commented to The Times "We were over the moon when we got permission, so this was a real bolt from the blue, like the magic wand of an evil wizard."

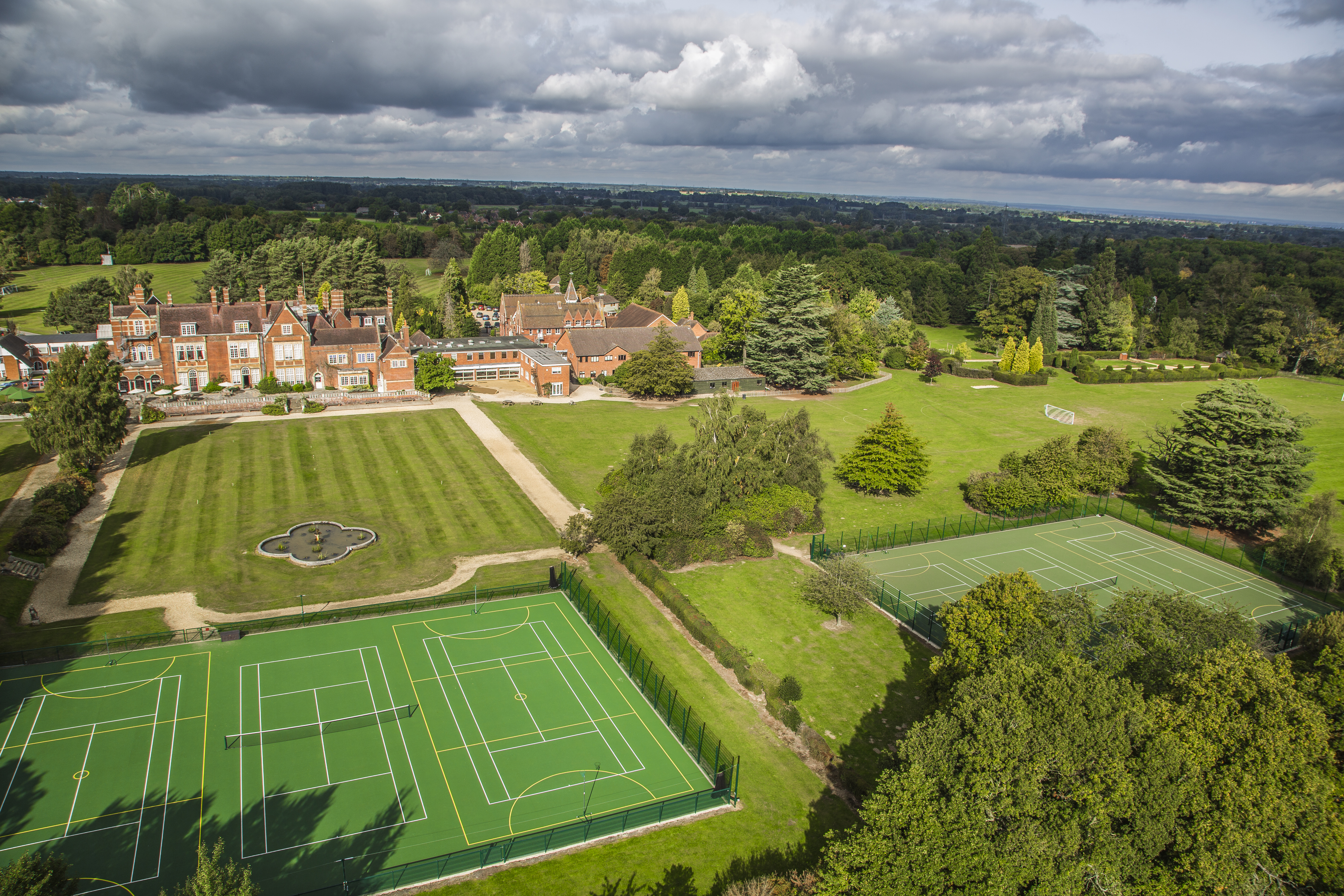
The main school building at Sherfield

In 2002 the school was in financial difficulties, largely due to leading boys' schools becoming mixed and parents moving girls to them to take their A-Levels. Gordonstoun School, supported by some members of the school's own governing body, made a bid to acquire it, and the success of this bid was announced in March 2002, when it was revealed that a new mixed-sex prep school was to be built in the grounds of Sherfield Manor and that North Foreland would continue as a girls-only senior school. A further announcement in The Times on 17 April 2002 stated that "The School is now one of the Gordonstoun Schools", adding that Nigel Havers would present the prizes at Carnival Day on 6 July. However, a year after Gordonstoun had bought North Foreland Lodge for a figure reported to be £1 million, the school was closed, leading to allegations of asset stripping. In January 2004 the school's site was sold to the Varkeys group for £6 million.

In February 2004 a company named GEMS Education acquired the former school, re-opening it for business in September as Sherfield School, a co-educational day school for children of all ages. In 2005 The Times reported that the new school had been planned to cater for 1,500 children but was failing to reach "critical mass", with the small numbers appearing forlorn. A North Foreland Lodge Hundredth Anniversary drinks party was held in London on 5 March 2009.

== Headmistresses ==
- 1909–1931: Mary Wolseley-Lewis (born 1865, died 1955)
- 1943–1967: Fenella M. Gammell
- 1967–1983: Dorothea Rosemary Katharine Irvine MA (Oxon.), (born 1922, known as Rosemary Irvine)
- 1983–1996: Diana Matthews
- 1996–2002: Susan Ruth Cameron

== Notable former pupils ==
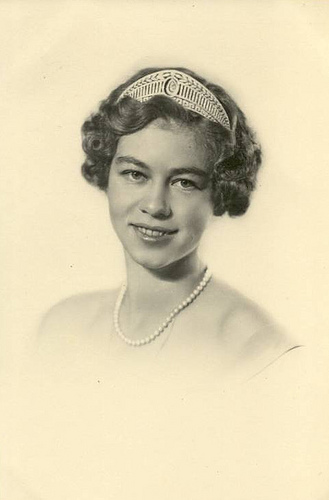
Queen Frederica of Greece

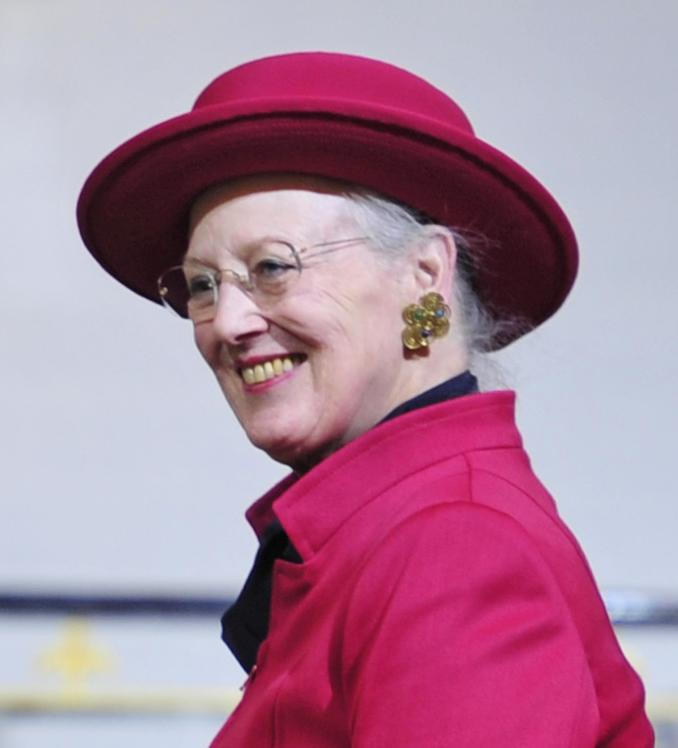
Queen Margrethe II of Denmark

In chronological order; see also Category:People educated at North Foreland Lodge

- Angela Pery, Countess of Limerick (1897–1981), Chairman of Standing Committee of International Red Cross, 1965–1973
- Dame Janet Vaughan (1899–1993), physiologist and Principal of Somerville College, Oxford
- Princess Katherine of Greece and Denmark (1913–2007), daughter of King Constantine I of Greece
- Sarah Churchill (1914–1982), actress, daughter of Sir Winston Churchill
- Princess Frederica of Hanover (1917–1981), later Queen of Greece as wife of King Paul of Greece
- Lady Elizabeth Montagu (1917–2006), novelist and teacher at the Royal College of Nursing
- Diana Parikian (1926–2012), antiquarian bookseller
- Penelope Hobhouse (born 1929), garden writer and designer and television presenter
- Althea Wynne (1936–2012), sculptor
- Queen Margrethe II of Denmark (born 1940)
- Audrey Lawson-Johnston (1915–2011), last living survivor of RMS Lusitania.
