= Guy Finch-Hatton, 14th Earl of Winchilsea =

English peer and banker (1885–1939)

The Right Honourable The Earl of Winchilsea OBE DSC
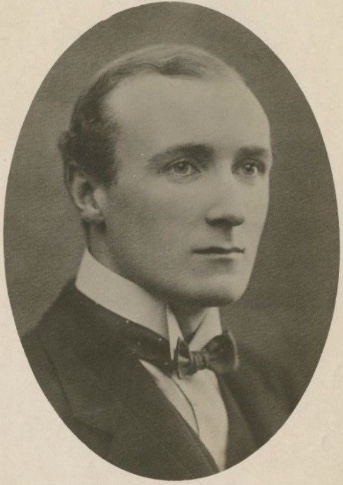

Personal details
- Born: Guy Montagu George Finch-Hatton; 28 May 1885
- Died: 10 February 1939 (aged 53) London, England
- Spouse: Margaretta Armstrong Drexel (m. 1910)
- Children: Christopher Finch-Hatton, 15th Earl of Winchilsea; Lady Daphne Straight; Lady Henrietta Tiarks
- Parents: Henry Finch-Hatton, 13th Earl of Winchilsea; Anne Jane Codrington
- Relatives: George Finch-Hatton, 10th Earl of Winchilsea (grandfather); Denys Finch Hatton (brother)
- Education: Magdalen College, Oxford

Guy Montagu George Finch-Hatton, 14th Earl of Winchilsea and 9th Earl of Nottingham OBE, DSC (28 May 1885 – 10 February 1939) was an English peer and banker. He was the elder brother of renowned big-game hunter Denys Finch-Hatton. His daughter married Whitney Straight of the American Whitney family and his son married a member of the Vanderbilt family.

== Early life ==
Guy Montagu George Finch-Hatton was born on 28 May 1885. He was the son of Henry Stormont Finch-Hatton (1852–1927) and the former Anne Jane Codrington. His two siblings were Gladys Margaret Finch-Hatton (who married Capt. Osmond Williams, a son of Sir Osmond Williams, 1st Baronet) and Denys Finch Hatton, a noted big-game hunter.

Finch-Hatton's father was the second son of George Finch-Hatton, 10th Earl of Winchilsea by his third wife Frances Margaretta (née Rice) Finch-Hatton (the eldest daughter of Edward Royd Rice MP of Dane Court and Elizabeth Austen, daughter of Edward Austen Knight). through his paternal grandmother he is related to Jane Austen, through his great grandmother Lady Elizabeth Murray he is related to Earls of Mansfields.

His maternal grandparents were Admiral of the Fleet Sir Henry Codrington and Helen Jane (née Smith) Codrington (a daughter of C. Webb Smith).

Lord Maidstone, hosted his coming of age party at Kirby Hall in 1906, when the tenantry were entertained in great style in the Great Hall. Country Life featured Kirby in October that year.

He was educated at Eton and Magdalen College, Oxford.

== Career ==
In 1908, he was Lieut with the Royal Engineers. During World War I, he served as Lt Cmdr Royal Naval Reserve from 1915 to 1917 and Lt Col Royal Air Force from 1917 to 1918. He was awarded Distinguished Service Cross and officer of the Order of the British Empire in 1919. From 1922 until his death in 1939, he was treasurer of St George's Hospital. In 1927, Finch-Hatton acceded to the title upon the death of his father, Henry Finch-Hatton, the 13th Earl of Winchilsea.

Shortly after his marriage in 1910, he became a member of the London Stock Exchange and a partner in the firm of Kitcat & Aitken, one of the leading firms of Bishopsgate Street. Lord Winchilsea was also a partner in securities firm of William P. Bonbright & Co. of London and New York. His brother-in-law John Armstrong Drexel was also a partner in the firm.

== Personal life ==
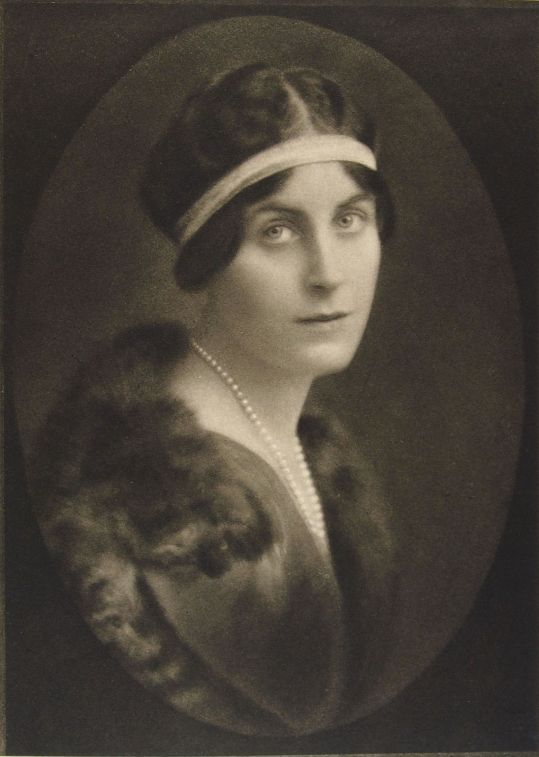
Photograph of his wife, Margaretta, from The Book of Fair Women by E.O. Hoppé, 1922

On 8 June 1910, Viscount Maidstone married American heiress Margaretta Armstrong Drexel (1885–1952) at St Margaret's, Westminster by the Bishop of London. The reception was held at the Drexel home in 22 Grosvenor Square attended by 1,500 guests. Margaretta, who had been presented at court in 1908 by Princess Louise Margaret of Prussia, the Duchess of Connaught, was the daughter of Margarita (née Armstrong) and Anthony Joseph Drexel Jr., and the granddaughter of Anthony Joseph Drexel, member of a wealthy Philadelphia banking dynasty. Her parents divorced in 1917 and her mother married Brinsley FitzGerald (fourth son of Sir Peter FitzGerald, 1st Baronet) in 1918. Margaretta's first cousin was Princess Anita de Braganza.

Together, Guy and Margaretta were the parents of three children:

1. Christopher Finch-Hatton, 15th Earl of Winchilsea (1911–1950), who married Countess Gladys Széchényi Sárvár-Felsövidék, daughter of Count László Széchényi de Sárvár-Felsövidék and Gladys Vanderbilt, owner of The Breakers and heiress of the prominent Vanderbilt family. They divorced in 1945 and he married Agnes Mary Conroy in 1946.
2. Lady Daphne Margarita Finch-Hatton (1913–2003), who married Whitney Straight (1912–1979), eldest son of one of the richest women in America, Dorothy Whitney, a member of the old Whitney family, in 1935.
3. Lady Henrietta Diana Juanita Finch-Hatton (1917–1977), who married Peter Frank Tiarks (1910–1975), son of wealthy banker Frank Cyril Tiarks.

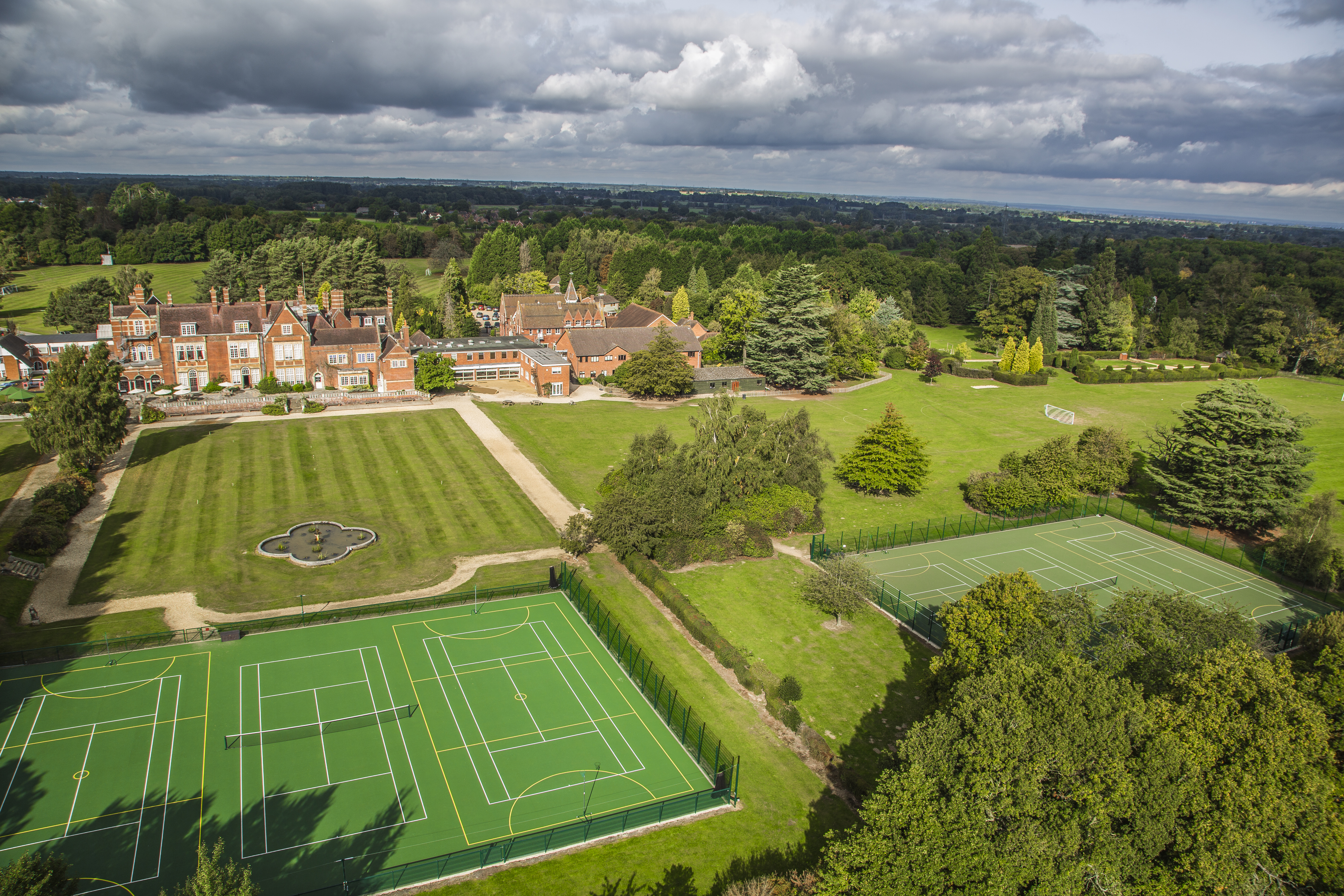
Buckfield House (Now Sherfield School)

With the ancestral seat of Eastwell Park having been sold by his uncle in 1894, the family resided in Haverholme Priory until it too was sold by his father in 1926. Kirby Hall was still owned by the Winchilsea, but it was in ruins. In 1926, Guy (Toby) and Margaretta decided to purchase their new country home, then named Buckfield House, at Sherfield-on-Loddon in Hampshire. The house was luxuriously renovated and contained many amenities fit for aristocrats and social elites.

Finch-Hatton died in London on 10 February 1939, at the age of 53 and was buried at Ewerby in Lincolnshire. His widow died in London in 1952.

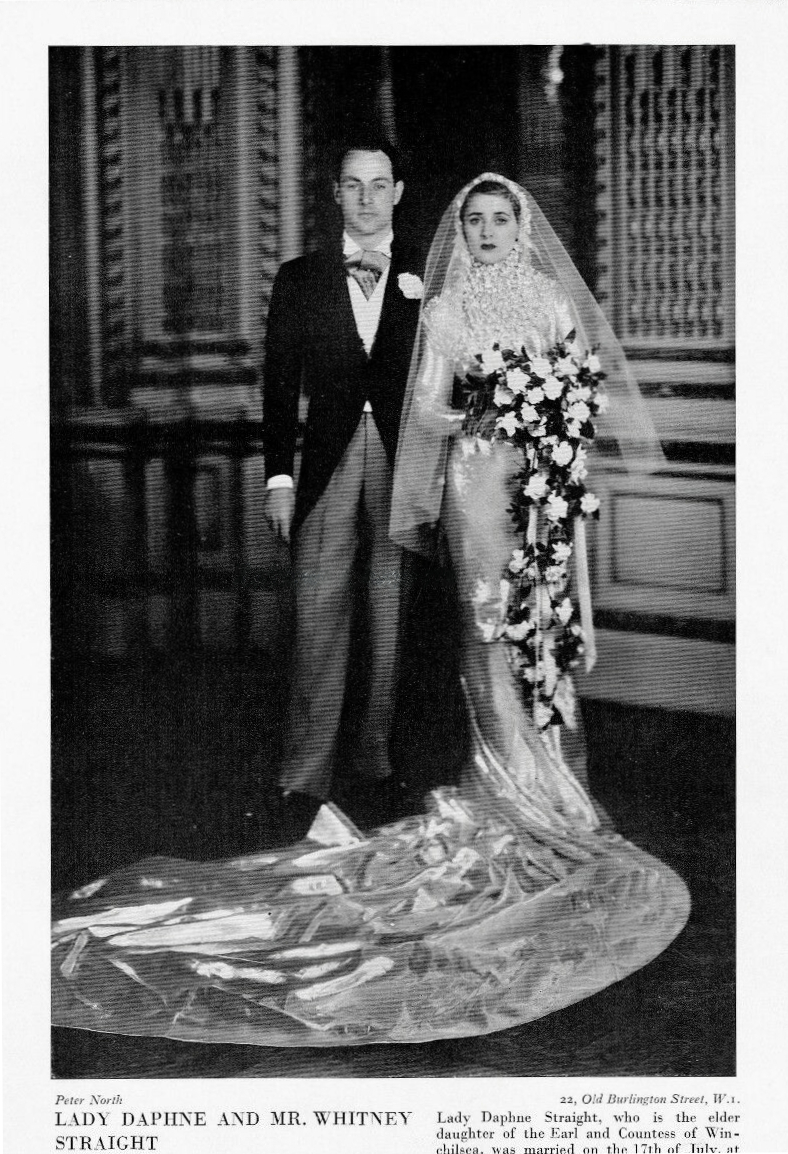
His daughter Lady Daphne Finch-Hatton (1913–2003) and her millionaire husband Whitney Straight

Peerage of England
Preceded by Henry Finch-Hatton	Earl of Winchilsea; 1927–1939	Succeeded by Christopher Finch-Hatton
Preceded by Henry Finch-Hatton	Earl of Nottingham; 7th creation 1927–1939	Succeeded by Christopher Finch-Hatton
