= Sherfield School =

Coordinates: 51°18′32″N 1°1′26″W

- Sherfield on Loddon; Hampshire, RG27 0HU; England

Information
- Type: Private day and boarding
- Motto: "Ad Vitam Paramus"
- Established: 2004
- Department for Education URN: 134769 Tables
- Head of School: Caroline Taylor
- Gender: Coeducational
- Age: 0 to 18
- Enrolment: As of 2023: 603
- Capacity: 630
- Houses: Buckfield, Wynstow, Lydney, Loddon
- Colours: Navy Blue, Silver, White
- Website: www.sherfieldschool.co.uk

Sherfield School is a coeducational private day and boarding school, located in Sherfield Manor by Sherfield on Loddon in Hampshire, England. It is set in 76 acres (31 ha) of parkland and is currently a school of over 600 pupils founded in 2004 by GEMS Education who sold the school to Education in Motion in September 2023.

Until 2003 the site was the location of the North Foreland Lodge girls boarding school, founded in 1909; and settled at Sherfield Manor in 1947.

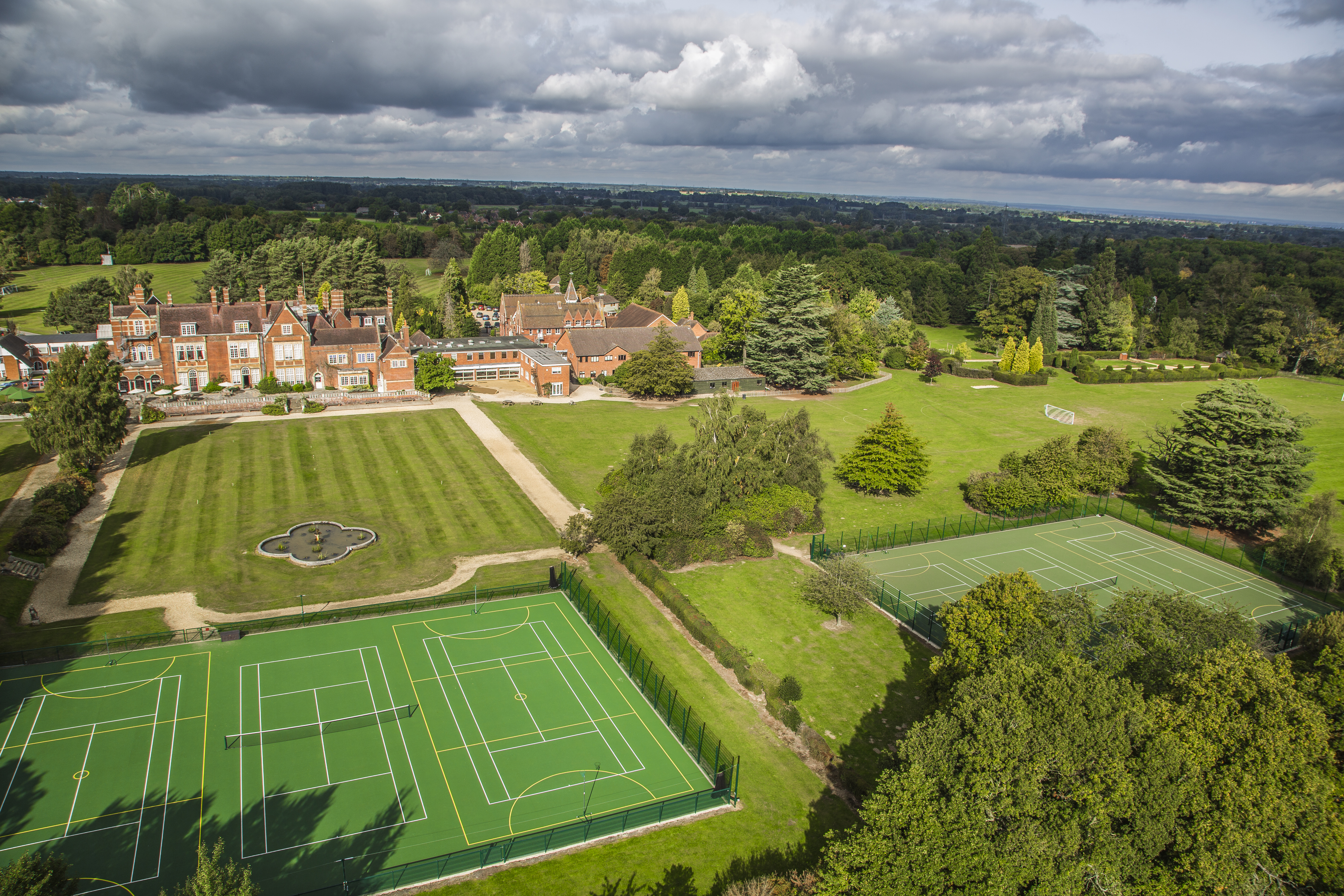
Sherfield School - Buckfield House

== Site history ==
The Sherfield Manor House site has history back to the early 12th century, when it was part of the manor of Odiham, but at some time before 1167 it was granted by Henry II to his Marshall, William FitzAldelm. This created the manor of Sherfield upon Loddon; it is possible that William Fitz Aldelm built the first Manor House.

Until the 19th century, the manor of Sherfield upon Loddon passed between various noble families, including the Earl of Winchilsea, Marquises of Winchester and later the Dukes of Wellington. In the 16th century, a country house known as Archer Lodge was built on the site of the Sherfield manor house and was later the residence of Paynton Pigott Stainsby Conant, a rich landowner. In 1870 this house was demolished by John Bramston Stane, who built a new house in a Victorian style, called Buckfield House, in the middle of a wood of the same name. In 1880, the house was renamed as Sherfield Manor and by 1897 had been further extended.

The Liddell family acquired the manor house in 1908 and were the last owners to hold manorial courts, responsible for minor offences, local administration, and the regulation and customs of the Sherfield upon Loddon manor. Their son, John Aidan Liddell, a pilot in the Royal Flying Corps, won both the Military Cross and the Victoria Cross for gallantry during the First World War and died from the wounds he had suffered in winning the VC.

In 1926 the house was purchased by the 14th Earl of Winchilsea owing to his wife's vast inheritance that was derived from the Drexel banking dynasty. During WWII, the Countess of Winchilsea led Britain's Women's Land Army, which trained 25,000 women to replace British farmers who were called up for active service. She also converted Buckfield House into a nurses home around this time. Lady Winchilsea sold the estate in 1947.

== School history ==
In 1947 (following its use as a military hospital in the Second World War), the Sherfield Manor site was purchased and operated by North Foreland Lodge, a girls' boarding school previously based in North Foreland, Kent. The buildings on the site were then extended over the years to a size in excess of 125,000 sq ft (11,600 m^{2}) with the site also including nine residential units. The North Foreland Lodge girls' boarding school used this site as a school from 1947 until 2003.

In 2001–2002, Gordonstoun School of Scotland sought to acquire the school with the support of some of the North Foreland Lodge governors, and the success of this bid was announced in March 2002, when it was revealed that a new prep school was to be built within the school grounds and that North Foreland would continue as a girls-only senior school. However, having paid only £1 million for the school, in 2003 Gordonstoun closed it, soon selling the land and buildings for £6 million.

The Gems Education group relaunched the site as Sherfield School in September 2004. Lucy Ward, writing in The Guardian, said that "this apparently traditional English independent school represents one face of a thrusting young newcomer causing ripples in the UK's private education market - the Dubai-based Global Education Management Systems", and noted that Gems is known overseas "for offering a distinctive brand of no-frills, low-cost private education". According to a Freedom of Information Request the school withdrew from the Teacher's Pension Scheme on 31 August 2020.

== Headteachers ==
- James Murphy O'Connor (Headmaster), 2004 - 2009
- Pat Preedy (Executive Principal), 2004 - 2012
- Richard Jaine (Head Master), 2012 - 2017
- Nick Fisher (Head Master), 2017
- Christopher James-Roll, (Acting Head Master) 2017-2018
- Nick Brain, (Headmaster) 2018 - 2023
- Neil Richards (Head of School, Interim), 2023
- Caroline Taylor (Head of School), 2024-

== See also ==
V irtual tour of the Sherfield school building
