= Henry Finch-Hatton, 13th Earl of Winchilsea =

English peer (1852–1927)

The Right Honourable The Earl of Winchilsea and Nottingham
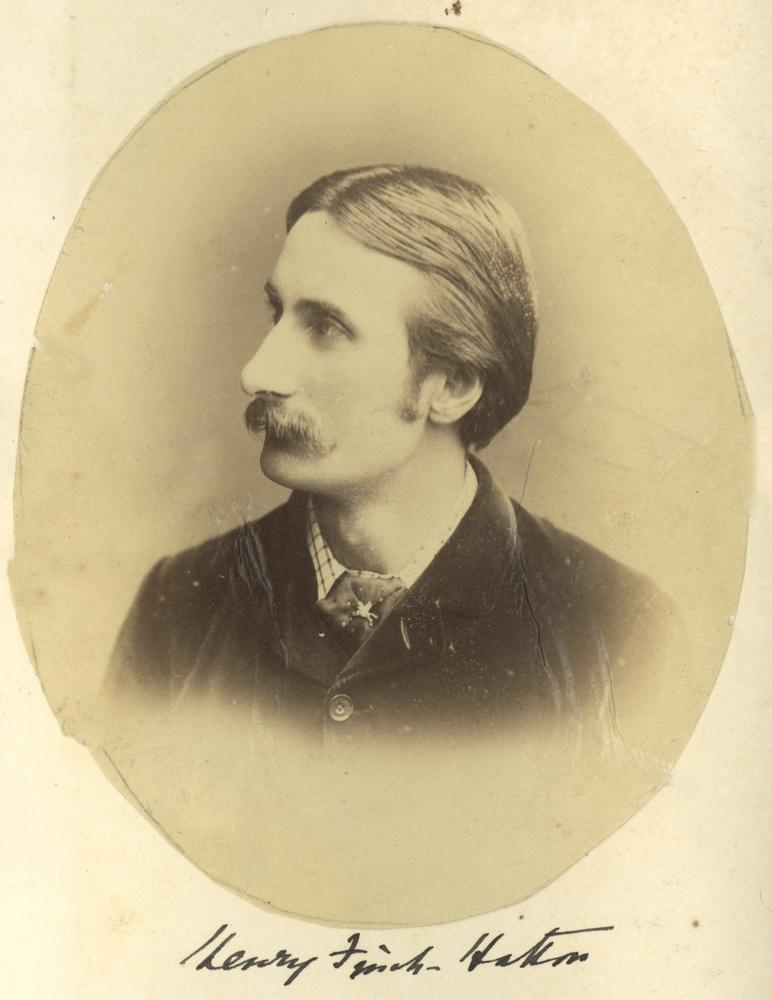
- Finch-Hatton in Queensland (c. 1875)

Personal details
- Born: Henry Stormont Finch-Hatton; 3 November 1852 Eastwell Park, Kent, England
- Died: August 14, 1927 (aged 74) London, England
- Resting place: Ewerby, Lincolnshire, England
- Spouse: Anne Jane Codrington (m. 1882; died 1924)
- Children: Lady Gladys Williams; Guy Finch-Hatton, 14th Earl of Winchilsea; Denys Finch-Hatton
- Parents: George Finch-Hatton, 10th Earl of Winchilsea (father); Frances Margaretta Rice (mother)
- Education: Eton College
- Alma mater: Balliol College, Oxford

Henry Stormont Finch-Hatton, 13th Earl of Winchilsea and 8th Earl of Nottingham (3 November 1852 – 14 August 1927) was an English peer.

== Early life ==
He was born at the family seat of Eastwell Park and the third son of George Finch-Hatton, 10th Earl of Winchilsea (1791–1858) and his third wife Frances Margaretta Rice (1820–1909). His maternal grandparents were Edward Royd Rice, British MP for Dover from 1847 to 1857, and the former Elizabeth Knight daughter of Edward Austen Knight, brother of Jane Austen

He was educated at Eton and matriculated at Balliol College, Oxford in 1874, although he remained at the university for only one year.

== Career ==
From 1875 until 1887, he was a cattle-farmer and gold miner in Queensland, Australia. His brother Harold Finch-Hatton joined him in Queensland, settling in the Mackay area from 1875 to 1883 and wrote an account of his experiences, entitled "Advance Australia".

In 1898, his older brother, Murray Finch-Hatton, 12th Earl of Winchilsea died, therefore, Henry succeeded him, inheriting the Haverholme estate and becoming both the Earl of Winchilsea and Nottingham.

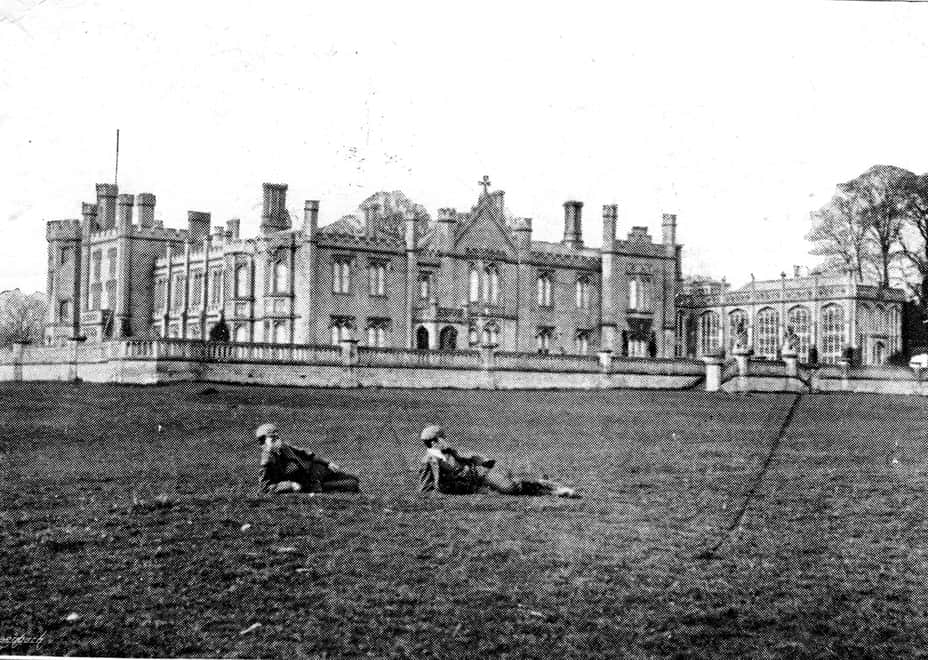
Haverholme Priory, Lincolnshire c. 1903. The boys are thought to be Denys and Guy Montagu Finch-Hatton

== Personal life ==
On 12 January 1882 at St Peter's Church, Eaton Square, he married Anne Jane Codrington (died 20 June 1924), daughter of Admiral Sir Henry Codrington and Helen Jane Smith. His wife's nickname was "Nan". Together they had three children:

1. Lady Gladys Margaret Finch-Hatton (1882–1964), who married Capt. Osmond Trahairn Deudraeth Williams (1883–1915), eldest son of Sir Osmond Williams, 1st Baronet.
2. Guy Montagu George Finch-Hatton, 14th Earl of Winchilsea (1885–1939), who married American heiress Margaretta Armstrong Drexel and succeeded his father.
3. Denys George Finch-Hatton (1887–1931), who died unmarried in East Africa, killed in a flying accident.

He died in London on 14 August 1927 at the age of 74 and was buried at Ewerby, Lincolnshire.

== Ancestry ==
Ancestors of Henry Stormont Finch Hatton

16. Daniel Finch, 7th Earl of Winchilsea
8. Hon. Edward Finch-Hatton
17. Hon. Anne Hatton
4. George Finch-Hatton
9. Anne Palmer
2. George William Finch-Hatton, 10th Earl of Winchilsea
10. David Murray, 7th Viscount Stormont, 2nd Earl of Mansfield
5. Lady Elizabeth Murray
11. Countess Henrietta Frederica von Bünau
Henry Stormont Finch Hatton, 13th Earl of Winchilsea
12. Henry Rice
6. Edward Royd Rice
13. Sarah Samson
3. Fanny Margareta Rice
14. Edward Austen Knight
7. Elizabeth Austen Knight
15. Elizabeth Bridges

Arms of Finch: Argent, a chevron between three griffins passant sable and Arms of Hatton

Heraldic achievement of Henry Finch-Hatton, 13th Earl of Winchilsea

Peerage of England
Preceded by Murray Finch-Hatton	Earl of Winchilsea; 1898–1927	Succeeded by Guy Finch-Hatton
Preceded by Murray Finch-Hatton	Earl of Nottingham; 7th creation 1898–1927	Succeeded by Guy Finch-Hatton
