= Denys Finch Hatton =

British aristocrat and big-game hunter (1887–1931)

The Honourable Denys Finch Hatton
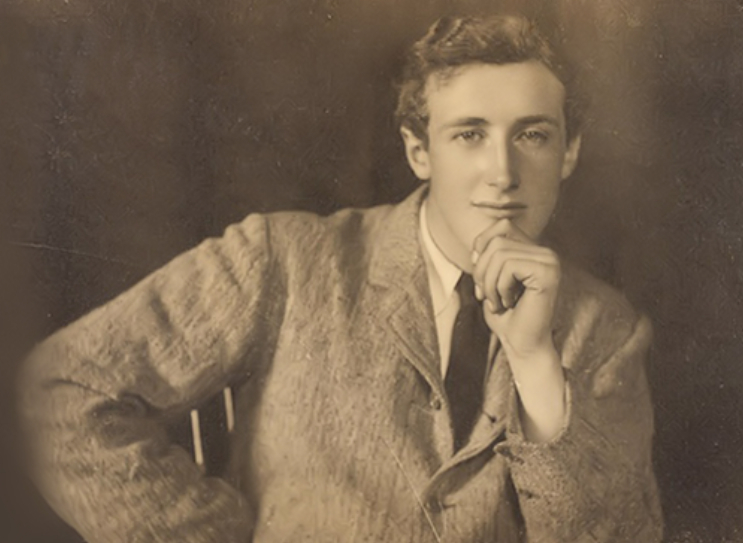
- Born: Denys George Finch-Hatton; 24 April 1887; Kensington, London, England
- Died: 14 May 1931 (aged 44); Voi, Kenya Colony
- Education: Eton College; Brasenose College, Oxford
- Parent(s): Henry Stormont Finch-Hatton, 13th Earl of Winchilsea; Anne Jane Codrington
- Relatives: Guy Finch-Hatton, 14th Earl of Winchilsea (brother)
- Military service
- Allegiance: United Kingdom
- Branch: British Army
- Rank: Lieutenant
- Unit: East African Mounted Rifles
- Conflicts: First World War
- Awards: Military Cross

Coat of arms

Denys George Finch Hatton MC (24 April 1887 – 14 May 1931) was a British aristocrat and big-game hunter, and the lover of Karen von Blixen, a wealthy Dane who married a Swedish Baron. She wrote about Finch Hatton in her autobiographical book Out of Africa, first published in 1937. In the book, his name is hyphenated: "Finch-Hatton".

== Early life ==
Finch Hatton was born in Prince of Wales Terrace, Kensington, London, on 24 April 1887, the second son and third child of Henry Stormont Finch-Hatton, 13th Earl of Winchilsea, and his wife, the former Anne Codrington, daughter of Admiral of the Fleet Sir Henry Codrington.

The Finch-Hatton family was old and aristocratic. His grandfather was George Finch-Hatton, 10th Earl of Winchilsea, whose mother was Lady Elizabeth Murray, a daughter of the 2nd Earl of Mansfield and a cousin of Dido Belle. Finch Hatton was also descended from Jane Austen's rich brother Edward Austen Knight, through his grandmother Fanny Margaret Rice, a daughter of Elizabeth Austen Knight and Edward Rice who married the 10th Earl of Winchilsea.

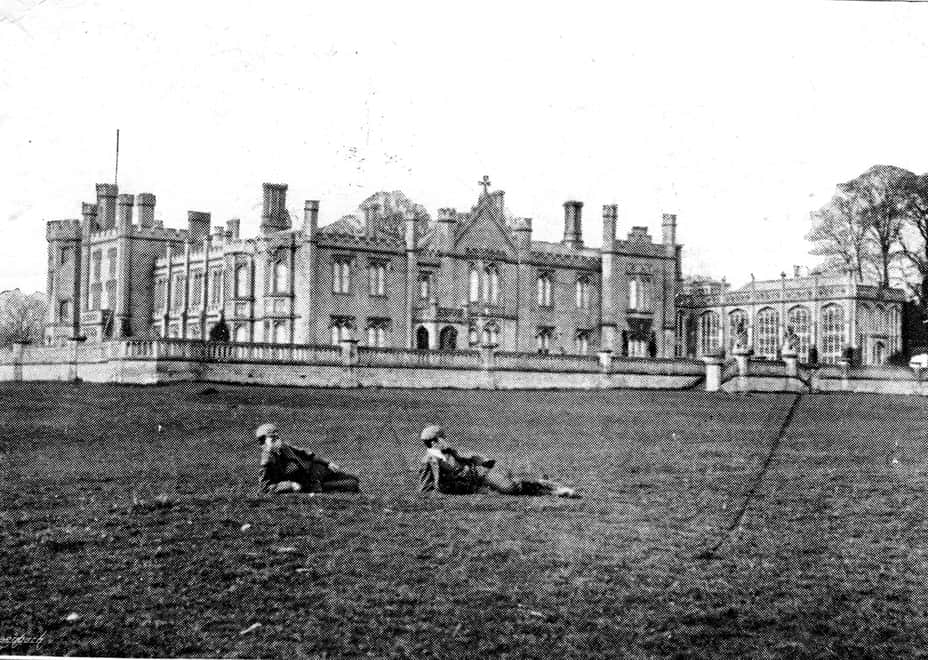
Haverholme Priory, 1903. the boys are thought to be Denys and Guy Finch-Hatton

By the 1860s, his half-uncle, George Finch-Hatton, 11th Earl of Winchilsea, had gambled away the family's several fortunes, and was forced to leave the ancestral seat Eastwell Park, which at the time of Finch Hatton's birth was already rented out to Prince Alfred, second son of Queen Victoria, and his wife Maria Alexandrovna of Russia. This was also the house where Finch Hatton's father was born, but as the Eastwell estate was let go he and his older brother were brought up by their mother quietly at Haverholme Priory, another country house inherited by the 10th Earl in 1831 from his childless aunt and uncle in law, Sir Jenison William Gordon, 2nd Baronet. The 10th Earl left Haverholme to his second son Murray (later the 12th Earl).

Finch Hatton's early years were spent in Haverholme with his cousins and uncle, but his family resided in the nearby Dower House. When his father inherited the peerages from his older brother in 1898 and became the 13th Earl, Denys and his siblings were relocated to Haverholme Priory. He was educated at Eton and Brasenose College, Oxford. At Eton, he was successful at athletics, served as secretary of the music society, and earned a degree in Modern History.

Denys enjoyed popularity at Eton. One of his admirers was the flamboyant and fabulously wealthy Philip Sassoon, whose only sister, Sybil, later through marriage became Marchioness of Cholmondeley. Denys had previously protected Sassoon from being bullied for his feminine behavior. In turn, Sassoon visited sick Denys and gifted him ruby shirt studs and diamond cuff links. Peeved by the vulgar opulence, Denys threw them away to the unlit grate, but decided to retrieve them to give them to his sister Gladys.

== In Africa ==
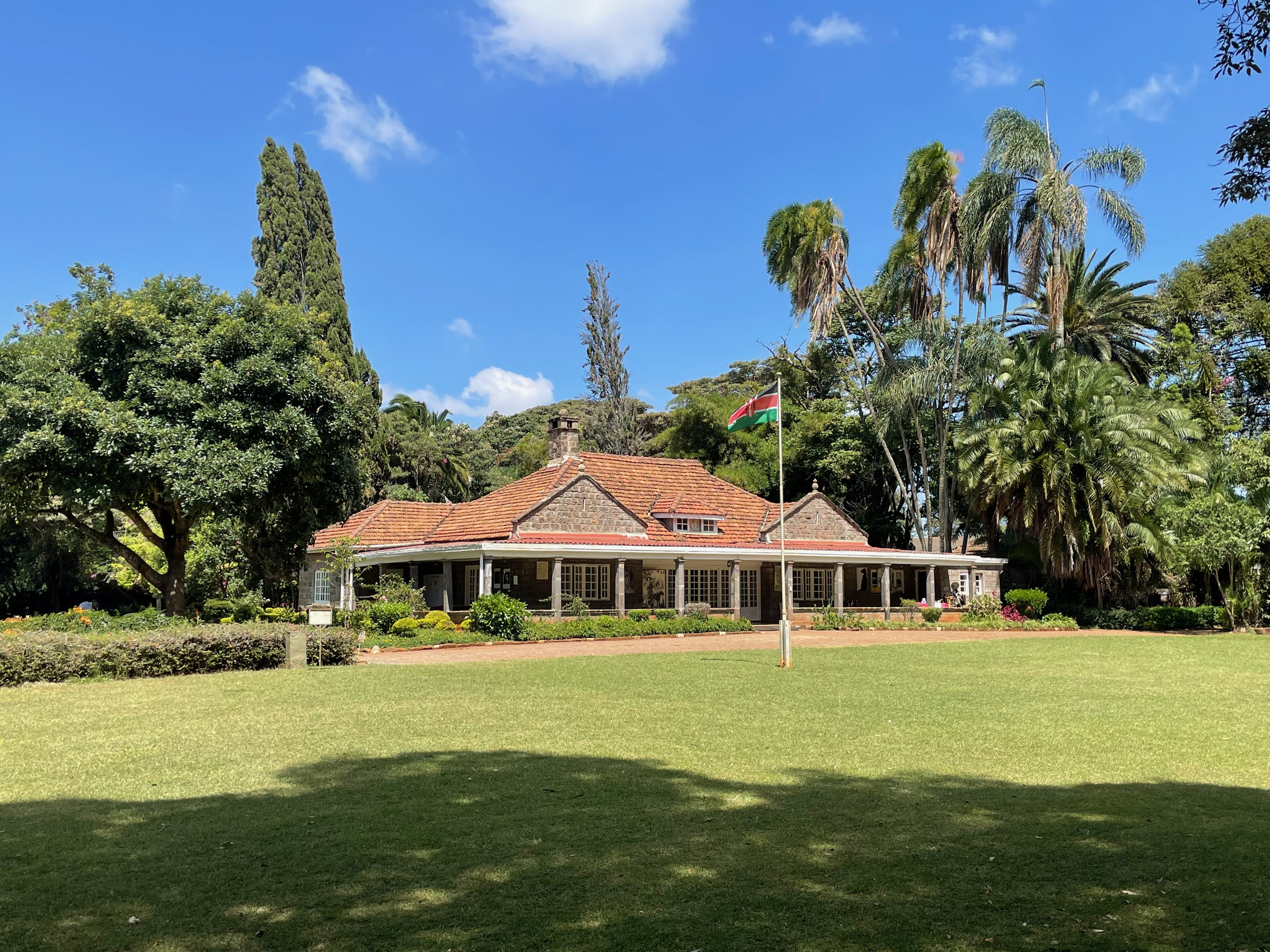
Blixen's house at the farm (now a museum)

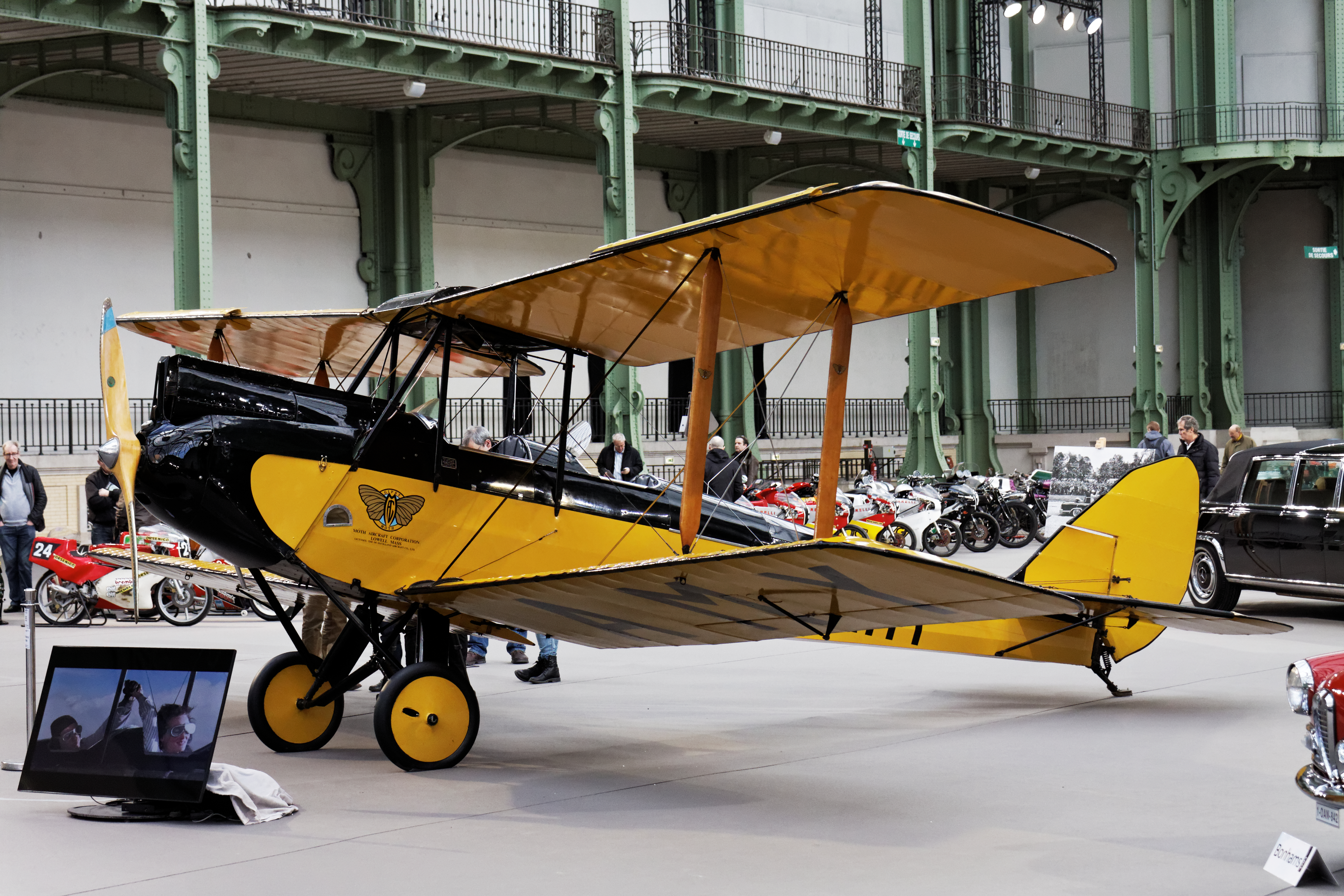
The Gipsy Moth used in the film Out of Africa

In 1910, after a trip to South Africa, Finch Hatton travelled to British East Africa and bought some land on the western side of the Great Rift Valley near what is now Eldoret. He turned over the investment to a partner and spent his time hunting. In Kenya, Finch Hatton was a close friend of the Hon. Reginald Berkeley Cole (1882–1925), an Anglo–Irish aristocrat, born into a prominent Ulster family, who had also settled in the colony. Cole was very well connected in Kenya, being the brother-in-law of Hugh Cholmondeley, 3rd Baron Delamere, the effective leader of the White settlers in the country.

In June 1910, Denys's older brother Guy Montagu (then Viscount Maidstone) snatched up and married the wealthiest American heiress of the season, Margaretta Armstrong Drexel, daughter of banking magnate Anthony Joseph Drexel Jr. They were married at 22 Grosvenor Square attended by 1500 guests, Denys attended the wedding but declined to be his best man. A year later in 1911, he went back to England to attend King George V and Queen Mary's coronation with his family.

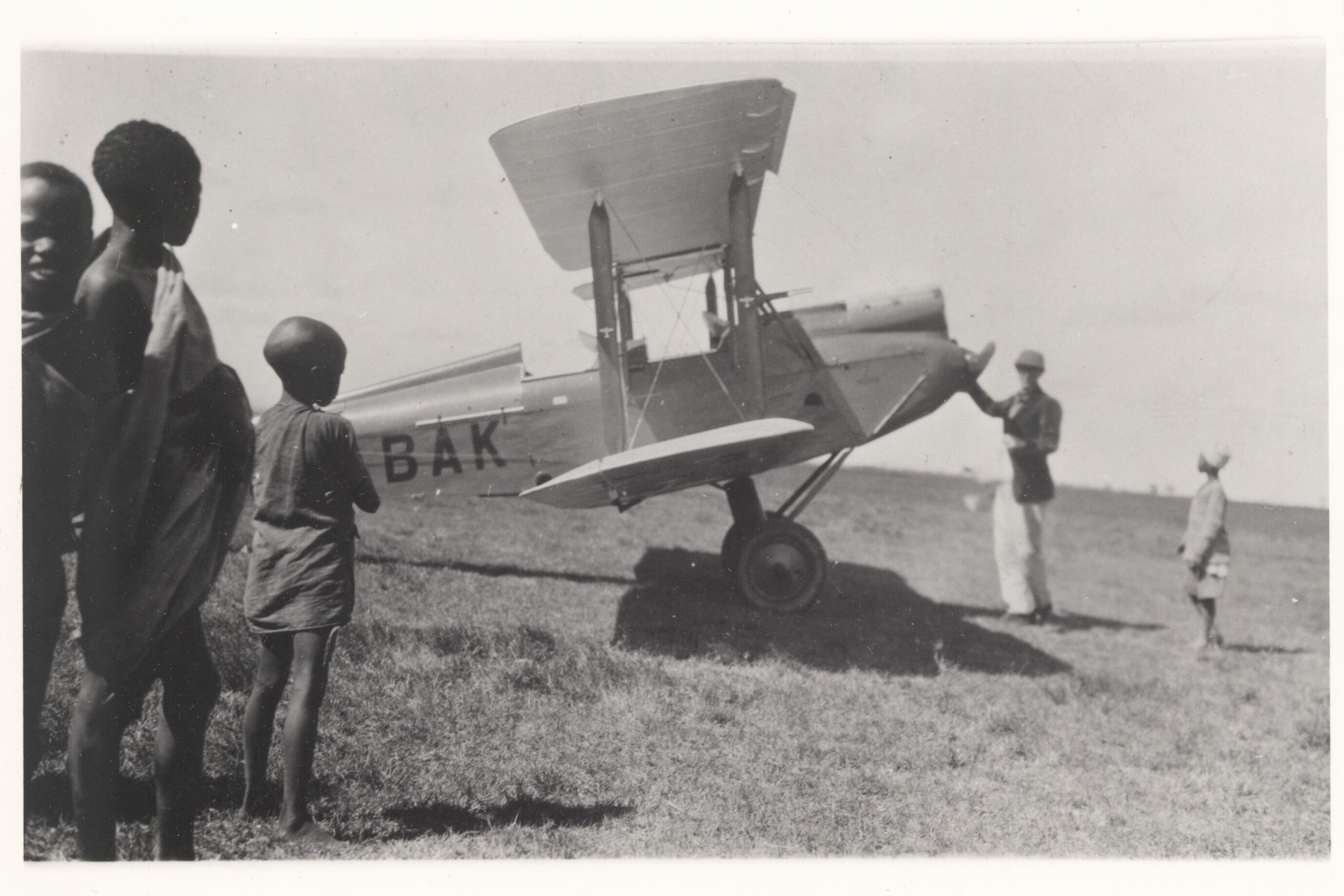
Denys Finch-Hatton showing his Gipsy Moth plane to some of Kenyan children.

In September 1914, Finch Hatton was commissioned as a temporary lieutenant during the First World War, attached to the East African Protectorate forces fighting in the East African campaign. He served with his friend Berkeley Cole, a former officer in the 9th Lancers and a temporary captain in command of an irregular force known as Cole's Scouts. The irregular unit was made up of Somali soldiers and British soldiers from the 2nd Battalion Loyal Regiment (North Lancashire). After this unit was disbanded, Finch Hatton was given a staff appointment as aide-de-camp to General Hoskins. On 1 February 1917, he was awarded the Military Cross.

In 1928 and 1930, Finch Hatton played host to the Prince of Wales, later Edward VIII, in a safari that switched from hunting to photography. This relationship led to Edward VIII's taking up Finch Hatton's causes, such as abandoning the use of cars for hunting safaris, and shifting towards filming big game, wildlife photography, and the founding of the Serengeti National Park.

=== Relationship with Blixen ===
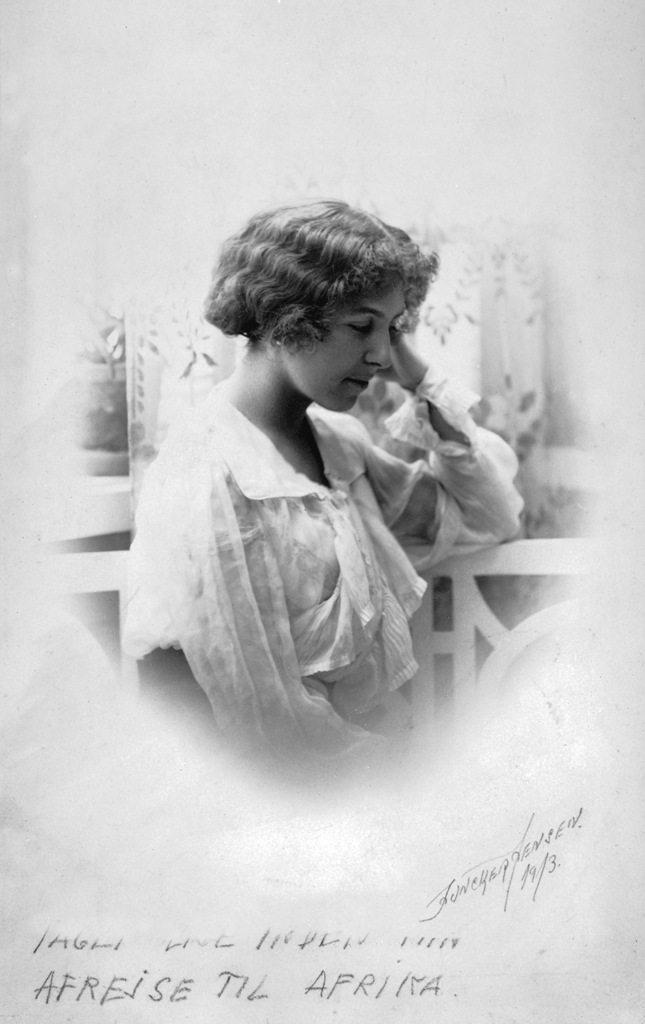
Karen Blixen in 1913

Finch Hatton was not known to have had any serious romances before he met Baroness Blixen. They were introduced at the Muthaiga Club on 5 April 1918. Soon afterwards he was assigned to military service in Egypt. On his return to Kenya after the Armistice, he developed a close friendship with Blixen and her Swedish husband, Baron Bror von Blixen-Finecke. He left Africa again in 1920 but returned in 1922, investing in a land development company.

By this time, Karen Blixen had separated from her husband, and after their divorce in 1925, Finch Hatton moved into her house and began leading safaris for wealthy sportsmen. Among his clients were Marshall Field Jr and Edward, Prince of Wales.

According to a highly sympathetic biography of Beryl Markham by author Mary S. Lovell, in 1930 Finch Hatton succumbed to a love affair with Markham, who was working as a race-horse trainer in Nairobi and the surrounding area. Markham had had a series of lovers, both single and married, and she had apparently had an attraction to Finch Hatton for years, but had not acted on it while Blixen, who gave Markham shelter and support over the years, was most deeply involved with Finch Hatton. During this period, however, he was also still seeing Blixen. Later, Markham became known as a pioneer flyer herself; Markham attributed her interest in flying to her association with famed aviator Tom Campbell Black.

=== Death ===
On the morning of 14 May 1931, Finch Hatton's Gipsy Moth took off from Voi Airport, circled the airport twice, then plunged to the ground and burst into flames. Finch Hatton and his Kĩkũyũ servant Kamau were killed. His final flight is recounted by fellow pilot Beryl Markham in her memoir West with the Night.

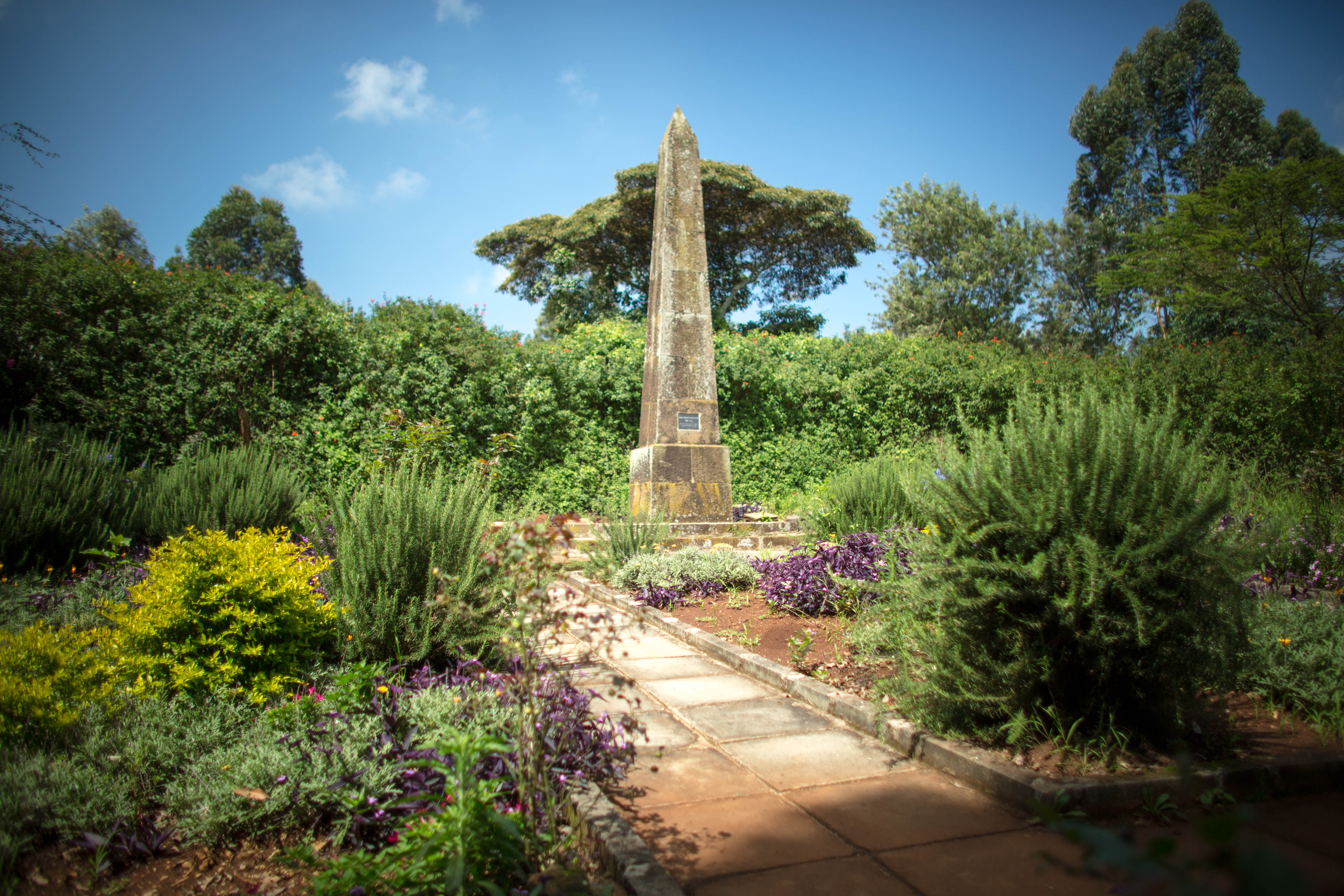
Denys Finch Hatton Grave, Kenya

In accordance with his wishes, Finch Hatton was buried in the Ngong Hills, some five miles (8 km) to the west of the present-day Nairobi National Park.

Karen Blixen had chosen the site. "There was a place in the hills, on the first ridge in the Game Reserve that I myself, at the time I thought that I was to live and die in Africa, had pointed out to Denys as my future burial-place. In the evening while we looked at the hills from my home, he remarked that then he would like to be buried there himself as well. Since then, sometimes when we drove out in the hills, Denys had said; 'Let us drive as far as our graves'."

Later, his brother the 14th Earl of Winchilsea erected an obelisk at the gravesite upon which he placed a simple brass plaque inscribed with Finch Hatton's name, the dates of his birth and death and an extract from Samuel Taylor Coleridge's narrative poem The Rime of the Ancient Mariner: "He prayeth well, who loveth well both man and bird and beast".

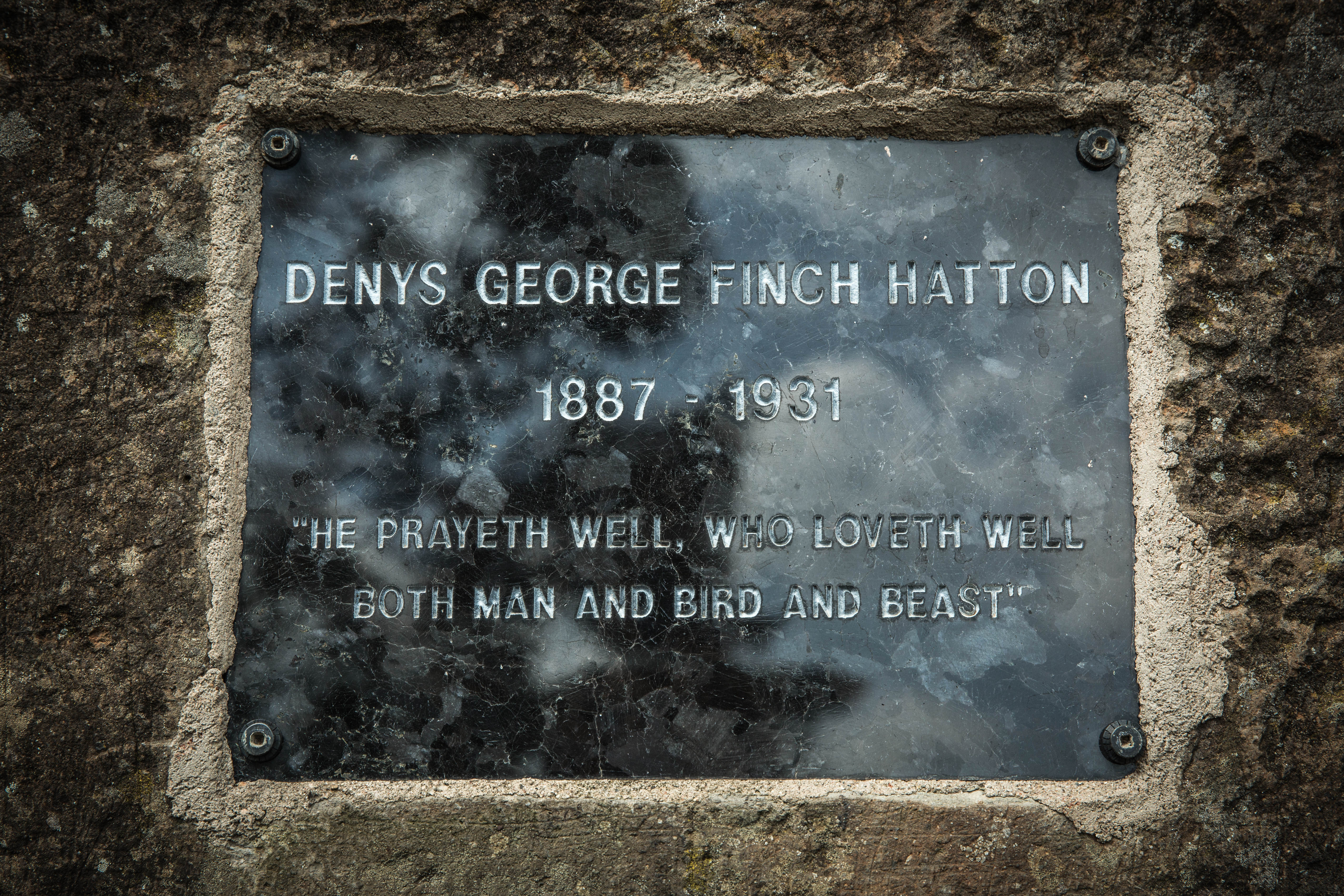
Plaque on obelisk, Denys Finch Hatton's Grave

A footbridge at Eton is inscribed with the words "Famous in these fields and by his many friends greatly beloved. Denys Finch Hatton 1900–1906". The dates refer to his attendance at Eton.

== Fictional portrayals ==
Finch Hatton was famously portrayed by Robert Redford in the 1985 award winning film adaptation Out of Africa.

He was portrayed by Trevor Eve in the 1988 miniseries Beryl Markham: A Shadow on the Sun.

== Ancestry ==
Ancestors of Denys George Finch-Hatton

16. Hon. Edward Finch-Hatton
8. George Finch-Hatton
17. Anne Palmer
4. George William Finch-Hatton, 10th Earl of Winchilsea
18. David Murray, 2nd Earl of Mansfield, 7th Viscount Stormont
9. Lady Elizabeth Murray
19. Imperial Countess Henrietta Frederica von Bünau
2. Henry Stormont Finch-Hatton, 13th Earl of Winchilsea
20. Henry Rice
10. Edward Royd Rice
21. Sarah Samson
5. Fanny Margareta Rice
22. Edward Austen Knight
11. Elizabeth Austen Knight
23. Elizabeth Brigdes
Hon. Denys George Finch-Hatton
24. Edward Codrington the elder
12. Sir Edward Codrington
25. Rebecca le Sturgeon
6. Sir Henry Codrington
26. Jasper Hall
13. Jane Hall
3. Anne Jane Codrington
14. C. Webb Smith
7. Helen Jane Smith
15. N.A.

== See also ==
- List of famous big game hunters
- Descriptions of Denys Finch Hatton
