= Anthony Joseph Drexel Jr. =

American banker and philanthropist (1864–1934)

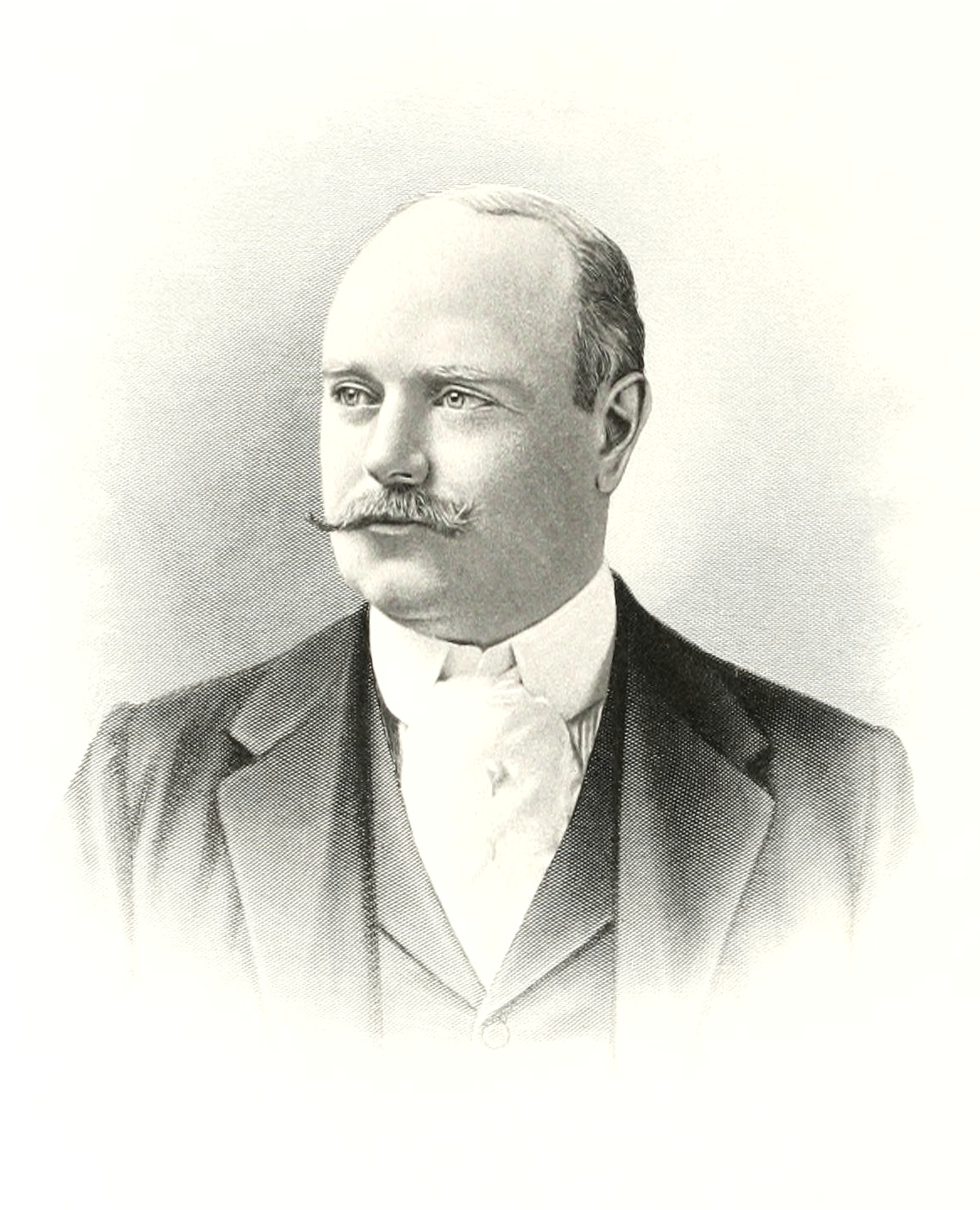
- Born: September 9, 1864; Philadelphia, Pennsylvania, U.S.
- Died: December 14, 1934 (aged 70); New York, New York
- Occupation: Banker
- Spouse: Margarita Armstrong (m. 1886; div. 1917)
- Children: 4
- Parent(s): Anthony Joseph Drexel; Ellen B. Rozet
- Relatives: John R. Drexel (brother); Alexander Van Rensselaer (brother-in-law); Francis Anthony Drexel (uncle); Joseph William Drexel (uncle); Katharine Drexel (cousin); Anthony Drexel Biddle Sr. (nephew); Francis Martin Drexel (grandfather)

Signature
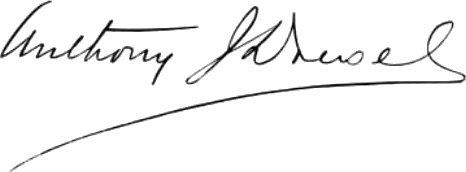

Anthony Joseph Drexel Jr. (September 9, 1864 – December 14, 1934) was an American banker and philanthropist who was a close friend of King Edward VII.

== Early life ==
Drexel was born on September 9, 1864, in Philadelphia to Anthony Joseph Drexel (1826–1893) and Ellen Rozet (1832–1891). He was one of nine children, including: Emilie Taylor Drexel, Frances Katherine Drexel, Mae E. Drexel, Sarah Rozet "Sallie" Drexel (the wife of Alexander Van Rensselaer), John Rozet Drexel, and George William Childs Drexel.

His father was the founder of Drexel, Morgan & Co with J.P. Morgan in 1871 as his junior partner, who also founded Drexel University in 1891. His maternal grandparents were John Roset and Mary Ann Laning. His paternal grandparents were Austrian-born American banker Francis Martin Drexel and Katherine Hookey.

== Career ==
In 1878, Drexel began working for his father's firm, Drexel & Co. in Philadelphia, and was made a partner on January 1, 1890. He was a partner at Drexel until October 21, 1893, when he resigned at age 29 after 16 years of working and just four months after his father's death, from Drexel & Co. of Philadelphia, Drexel, Morgan & Co. of New York, and Drexel, Harjes & Co. of Paris.

At the time, a close friend of his exclaimed to The New York Times, "He does not care to assume the cares and responsibilities which are attached to the business. He is a young man who is very fond of life in the society. His pleasures would have to be curtailed immeasurably were he to continue closely identified with the business his father established, and he does not care for the confinement and close application to which he would be subjected. He prefers to be free footed, and will withdraw. That is all there is to his action. It is said it has no significant whatsoever."

Shortly thereafter, he bought one of the most valuable residences in Philadelphia, the Wilstach mansion at the northeast corner of 18th and Walnut Streets, for $175,000. In November of the same year, he also bought the steamer Avenel from W. P. Whitlock.

=== Lifestyle ===
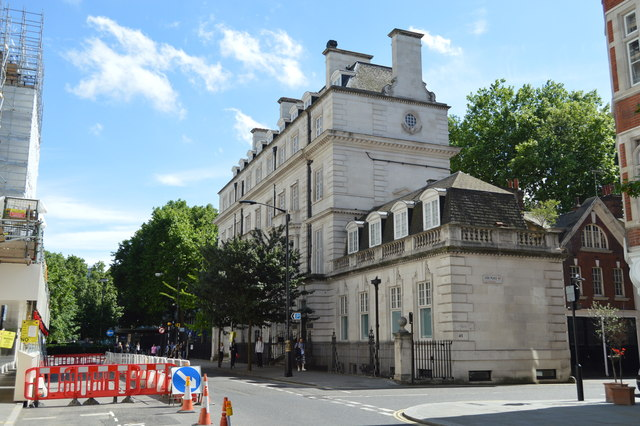
22 Grosvenor Square, it encompassed the entire corner, now a hotel and restaurant "The Twenty Two", Mayfair, London.

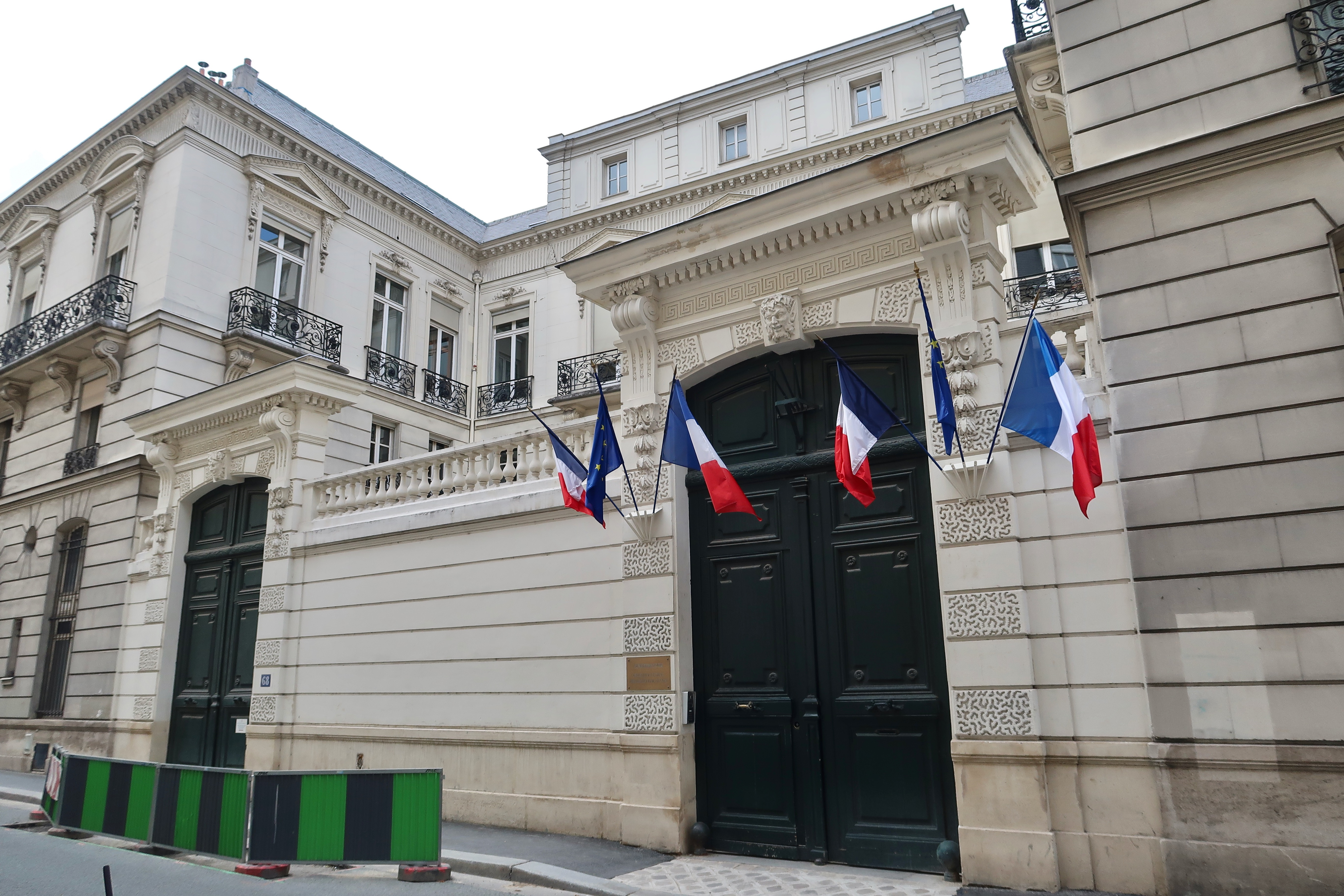
68 rue de Bellechasse, Paris.

After his father's death on June 30, 1893, Drexel decided to live in Europe. He lived in London on 22 Grosvenor Square and Carlton House Terrace for several years. Drexel and his wife Margarita Armstrong employed Sir Charles Allom to make several alterations while at 22 Grosvenor Square, adding a new larger ballroom in the style of "Louis XVI" and put in new marble floors and staircase. In 1910, the Drexels hosted 1,500 guests here on the occasion of their only daughter Margaretta's society wedding to Guy Finch Hatton, Viscount Maidstone (afterwards 14th Earl of Winchilsea). The young couple joined the Drexels here until the Drexel marriage unravelled and Drexel moved to Paris. The Maidstones decamped around the corner to 19 Grosvenor Street.

While there, they were friends with Clyde Fitch, a successful and prolific dramatist. From 1915 until his death, however, he then resided at the 68 rue de Bellechasse in Paris as well as homes in the provinces, after his difficult divorce with his wife. In addition to his reputation as a lavish entertainer, he was known as a keen yachtsman and owned several famous yachts including Sayonara, Margarita and Aloma.

He was a member of the Philadelphia Club, Rabbit Club, Racquet Club and Corinthian Club in Philadelphia and the Knickerbocker Club, Union Club, New York Yacht Club, and Turf and Field Club of New York.

== Personal life ==
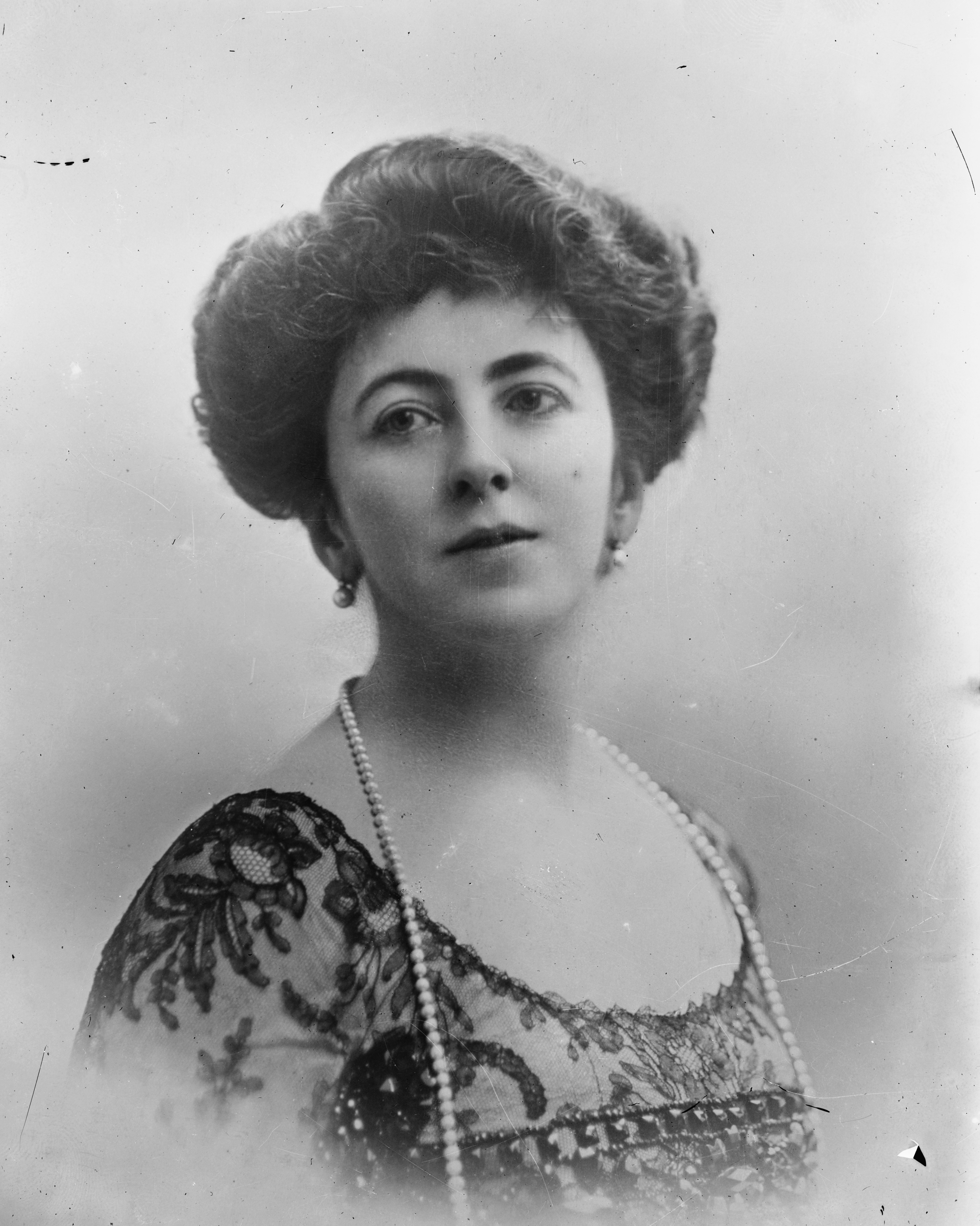
Photograph of Drexel's wife, Rita Armstrong Drexel, by Lallie Charles

On September 14, 1886, he married Margarita "Rita" Armstrong (1867–1948), a daughter of John Armstrong (1823–1884), of the Baltimore Armstrongs, and Margaretta Armstrong (1833–1900, née McKee, daughter of US Army Col. William R. McKee), and only sibling of Anne "Annie" Armstrong Stewart (1864–1925, mother of the New York socialite Princess Anita of Braganza). Together, they had:

- Anthony Joseph Drexel III (1887–1946), who married Marjorie Gould (1891–1955), a daughter of Edith Kingdon and George Jay Gould.
- Margaretta Armstrong Drexel (1889–1952) who married Guy Finch-Hatton, 14th Earl of Winchilsea (1885–1939), in 1910 and was the mother of Christopher Finch-Hatton, 15th Earl of Winchilsea.
- John Armstrong Drexel (1891–1958), an aviation pioneer.
- Louis Clapier Norris Drexel (1896–1962)

On May 25, 1917, Anthony and Margarita divorced after several years of separation and a bitterly contested trial. In January 1918, Margarita married secondly Lt.-Col. Brinsley FitzGerald, son of Sir Peter FitzGerald, 1st Bt. and 19th Knight of Kerry.

Drexel died of uremic poisoning in 1934, aged 70, while staying in New York at the Hotel Ambassador.
