= John Armstrong Drexel =

American aviation pioneer

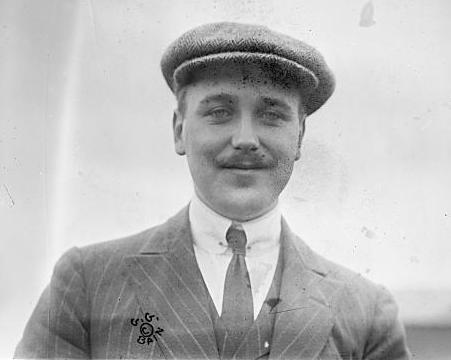
- Drexel in 1910
- Born: October 24, 1891; Philadelphia, Pennsylvania, U.S.
- Died: March 4, 1958 (aged 66); Ashford, Kent, England
- Occupation: Aviator
- Parent(s): Anthony Joseph Drexel, Jr. Margarita Armstrong
- Relatives: Anthony Joseph Drexel (grandfather); Margaretta Finch-Hatton, Countess of Winchilsea (sister); Anthony Joseph Drexel III (brother)

John Armstrong Drexel (October 24, 1891 – March 4, 1958) was an American aviation pioneer who was a member of the prominent Drexel family of Philadelphia.

== Early life ==
Drexel was a son of Anthony Joseph Drexel Jr. (1864–1934) and Margarita Armstrong (1867-1948). His elder brother was banker, and aviator, Anthony Joseph Drexel III, and his only sister Margaretta was married to Guy Finch-Hatton, 14th Earl of Winchilsea.

He was a grandson of Anthony Joseph Drexel, millionaire banker and founder of Drexel University. His father began working for his grandfather at Drexel & Co., Drexel, Morgan & Co. of New York, and Drexel, Harjes & Co., and was made a partner on January 1, 1890, shortly before his birth. His father resigned on October 21, 1893, just four months after his grandfather's death, and then lived a life of leisure. Aside from his inheritance from the estate of his father, which he shared with his three siblings, he inherited $1,000,000.

== Career ==
With William McArdle, he founded the New Forest Flying School at East Boldre, the second school for pilots in Great Britain and the fifth in the world.

On June 21, 1910, Drexel was the 10th aviator to receive his British Royal Aero Club Aviators Certificate, recognized under the Fédération Aéronautique Internationale. He also became only the 8th Aviator to receive an Aero Club of America pilot's licence, taking the test in his Gnôme engined Blériot monoplane.

On August 12, 1910, he set the world altitude record of 6,595 feet in a Blériot monoplane In competition in Lanark, Scotland. In November 1910, in an attempt to fly cross-country, he lost his way and had to land near the Delaware River.

=== Military service ===
During World War I, he served as chauffeur to Field Marshal Sir John French, and later, flew with the French Lafayette Escadrille until 1917. He was subsequently commissioned Major in the Aviation Section, U.S. Signal Corps, serving until the end of the war in the United States Army Air Service.

=== Later career ===
In 1926, Drexel drove the Flying Scotsman train from London to Edinburgh.

In 1934, Drexel served as a partner in the securities firm of William P. Bonbright & Co., along with August Belmont IV. He also served on Bonbright's board and on the board of the Anglo-South American Bank.
