= George Finch-Hatton, 11th Earl of Winchilsea =

British peer and Tory politician

The Right Honourable; The Earl of Winchilsea
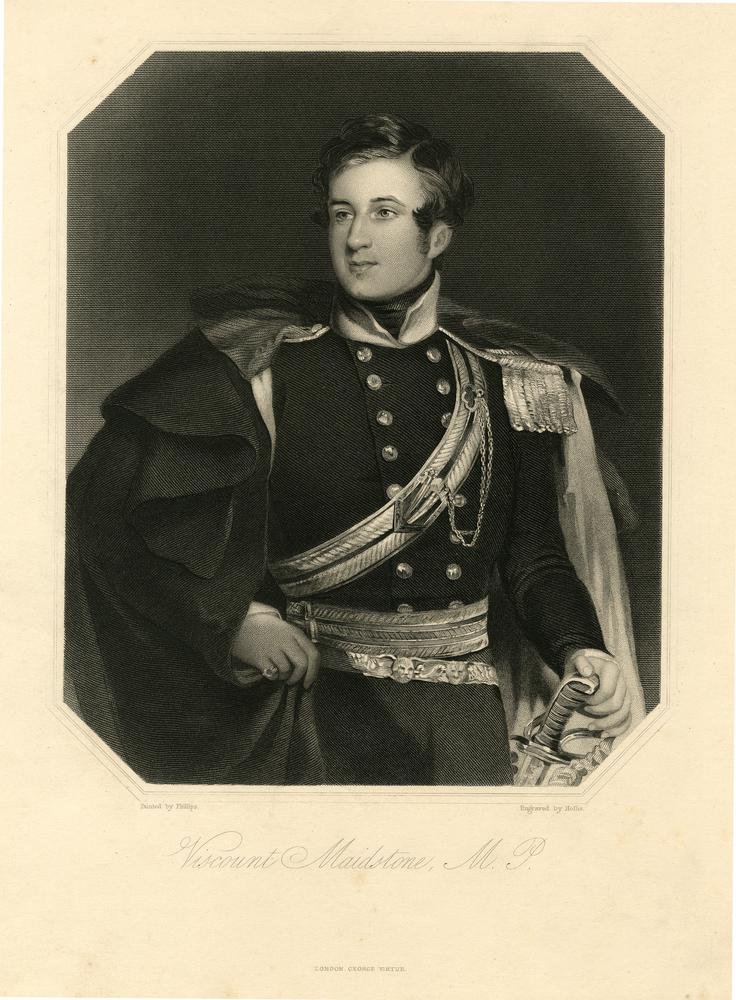
- Portrait of George James Finch-Hatton, 11th Earl of Winchilsea, when Viscount Maidstone
- Predecessor: George Finch-Hatton
- Successor: Murray Finch-Hatton
- Other titles: Earl of Nottingham; Viscount Maidstone; Baron Finch of Daventry
- Born: George James Finch-Hatton; 31 May 1815
- Died: 9 June 1887 (aged 72)
- Spouses: Lady Constance Paget (m. 1846; died 1878); Lady Elizabeth Conyngham (m. 1882)
- Issue: Mabel Eden, Baroness Auckland; Lady Constance Howard; George Finch-Hatton, Viscount Maidstone; Lady Hilda Higgins
- Parents: George Finch-Hatton, 10th Earl of Winchilsea; Lady Georgiana Graham

George James Finch-Hatton, 11th Earl of Winchilsea and 6th Earl of Nottingham MP (31 May 1815 – 9 June 1887), styled Viscount Maidstone between 1826 and 1857, was a British peer and Tory politician.

== Early life ==
Winchilsea was born in May 1815 in London and was the son of George Finch-Hatton, 10th Earl of Winchilsea and 5th Earl of Nottingham (1791–1858) by his first wife Lady Georgiana Charlotte (d. 1835), daughter of James Graham, 3rd Duke of Montrose (1755–1836) and Lady Caroline Montagu, daughter of 4th Duke of Manchester.

== Career ==
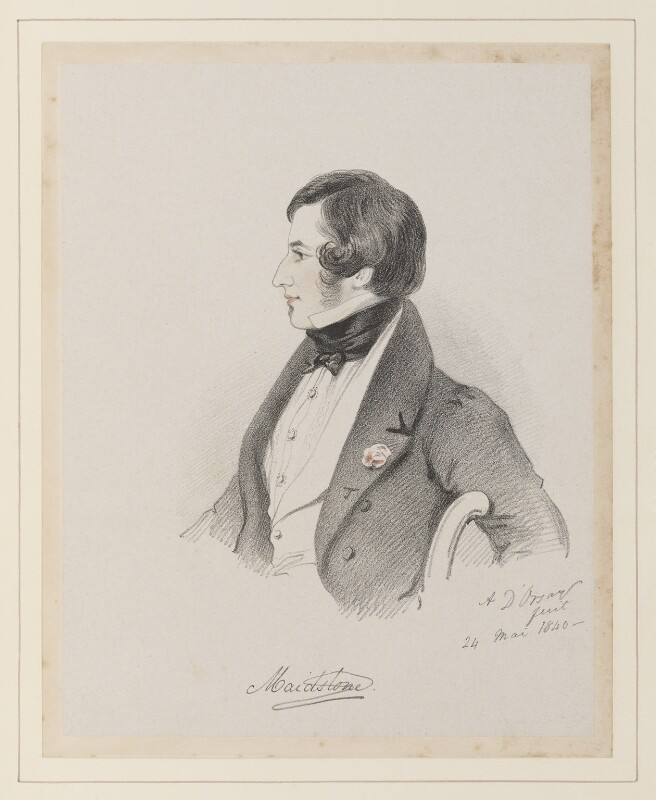
Drawing by Count Alfred D'Orsay c.1840

Winchilsea was elected as a Member of Parliament (MP) for Northamptonshire North in 1837, a seat he held until 1841. In 1858 he succeeded his father in the earldom and entered the House of Lords.

=== Estates ===
In the mid-1860s, Lord Winchilsea experienced serious financial difficulties due to his gambling addiction, which eventually forced him to leave his property at Eastwell Park in Kent. On 4 December 1868, trustees (including his in-law the 6th Duke of Richmond) appointed under the Winchilsea Estate Act (1865) entered into a contract to settle his debts by means of his estates, first was to let Eastwell Park, together with its furnishings and effects, to the Duke of Abercorn for a period of five years. Lord Winchilsea had been obliged to vacate the property some time prior to December 1868, and he was formally adjudged bankrupt on 5 October 1870. Before his bankruptcy, Lord Winchilsea had accumulated astronomical debts of about £101,000 ( £17 million in 2025).

Eastwell was next occupied by Prince Alfred, Duke of Edinburgh, the second son of Queen Victoria.

Despite his bankruptcy, by 1883, his combined lands and estates generated about £19,000 a year.

== Personal life ==
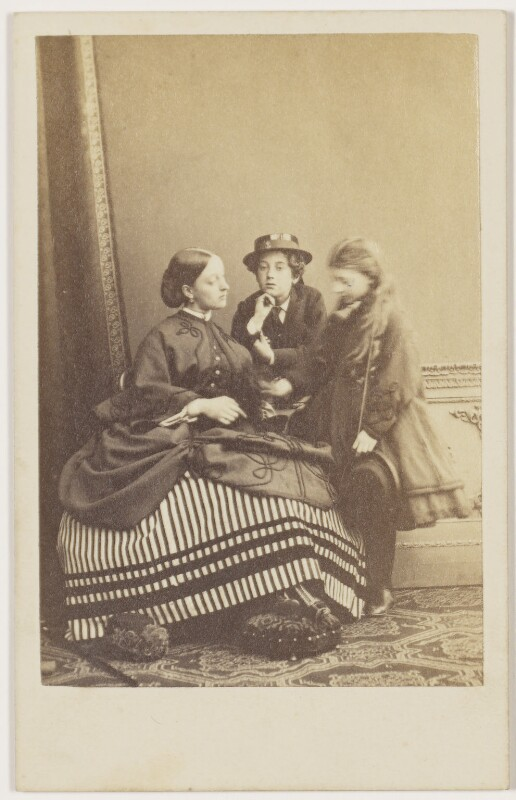
Lady Florence Cecilia Paget (Marchioness of Hastings), George Finch Hatton (Viscount Maidstone), Lady Hilda Jane Sophia, circa 1864.

Lord Winchilsea was married twice. In 1846, he married Lady Constance Henrietta Paget (1823 – 1878), daughter of Henry Paget, 2nd Marquess of Anglesey and Eleanora Campbell, daughter of Lady Charlotte Campbell (daughter of John Campbell, 5th Duke of Argyll). Lord Winchilsea and Lady Winchilsea were noted to be one of the handsomest couple of their days. They had one son and three daughters :

- Lady Mabel Emily Finch-Hatton (1849–1872), who married William George Eden, 4th Baron Auckland (1829–1890)
- Lady Constance Eleanora Caroline Finch-Hatton (1851–1910), who married Hon. Frederick Charles Howard (1840–1893), son of Henry Howard, 2nd Earl of Effingham, had issue, Gordon, 5th Earl of Effingham
- George Finch-Hatton, Viscount Maidstone (1852–1879), who married Louisa, daughter of Sir George Jenkinson, 11th Baronet, died aged 27 with no children
- Lady Hilda Jane Sophia Finch-Hatton (1856–1893), who married Henry Vincent Higgins (d. 1928)

In 1847, Lord Maidstone went to watch Jenny Lind sang at her majesty's theatre.

On 2 May 1862, Lord and Lady Winchilsea and Lady Florence Paget attended the Banquet at Stafford House (Lancaster House) given by The Duke and Duchess of Sutherland.

After his first wife died in March 1878, he married his wife's first cousin, Lady Elizabeth Georgiana (died 1904), daughter of Francis Conyngham, 2nd Marquess Conyngham and Lady Jane Paget (sister to 2nd Marquess of Anglesey), in 1882. There were no children from this marriage.

His half-brother, Henry, later the 13th Earl of Winchilsea, wrote about him in his diary despite what happened with the family fortune "I hope he knew how fond of him we all were. But he was always thinking we must hate him. We didn't."

Lord Winchilsea died in June 1887, aged 72. As his only son, George Finch-Hatton, Viscount Maidstone, had predeceased him, he was succeeded in his titles by his half-brother, Murray Finch-Hatton, 12th Earl of Winchilsea. Lady Winchilsea died in February 1904. Lord Winchilsea, his son and his second wife are buried in the cemetery of the now ruined church of St Mary the Virgin at Eastwell Park.

== Ancestry ==
Ancestors of George James Finch Hatton

8. Hon. Edward Finch-Hatton
4. George Finch-Hatton
9. Anne Palmer
2. George William Finch-Hatton, 10th Earl of Winchilsea
10. David Murray, 2nd Earl of Mansfield
5. Lady Elizabeth Murray
11. Countess Henrietta Frederica von Bünau
George James Finch-Hatton, 11th Earl of Winchilsea
12. William Graham, 2nd Duke of Montrose
6. James Graham, 3rd Duke of Montrose
13. Lady Lucy Manners
3. Lady Georgiana Charlotte Graham
14. George Montagu, 4th Duke of Manchester
7. Lady Caroline Montagu
15. Elizabeth Dashwood

=== Descendants ===
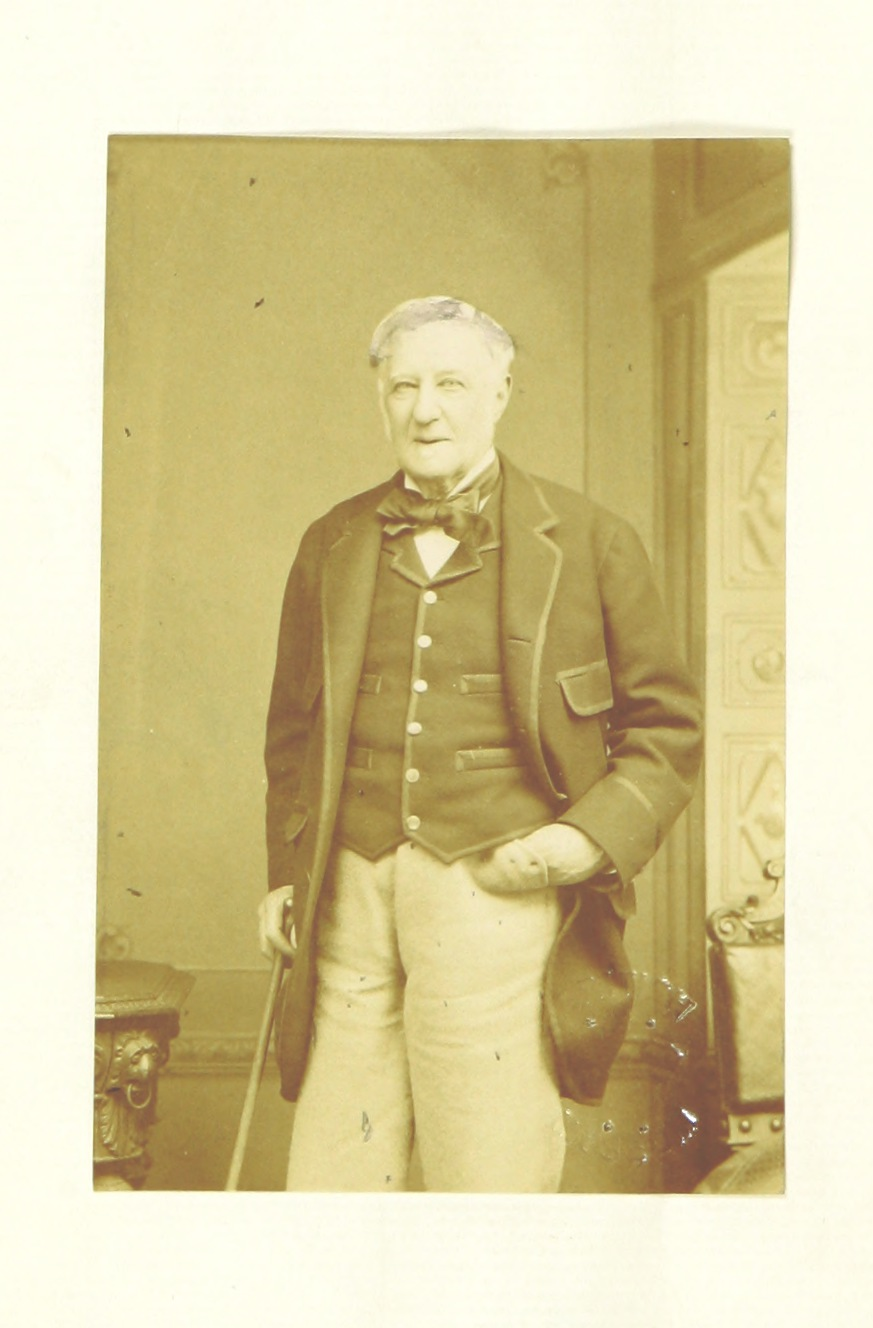
Photograph of Lord Winchilsea

Through his daughter, Lady Constance, he was the grandfather of Gordon Howard, 5th Earl of Effingham (1873–1946), who married Rosamond Margaret Hudson and later, Madeleine Foshay, and Capt. Hon. Algernon George Mowbray Frederick Howard (1874–1950). Through his grandson, the 5th Earl of Effingham, he was the great-grandfather of Mowbray Howard, 6th Earl of Effingham (1905–1996), Hon. John Algernon Frederick Charles Howard (1907–1970), and Hon. Nicholas Howard (1919–2016).

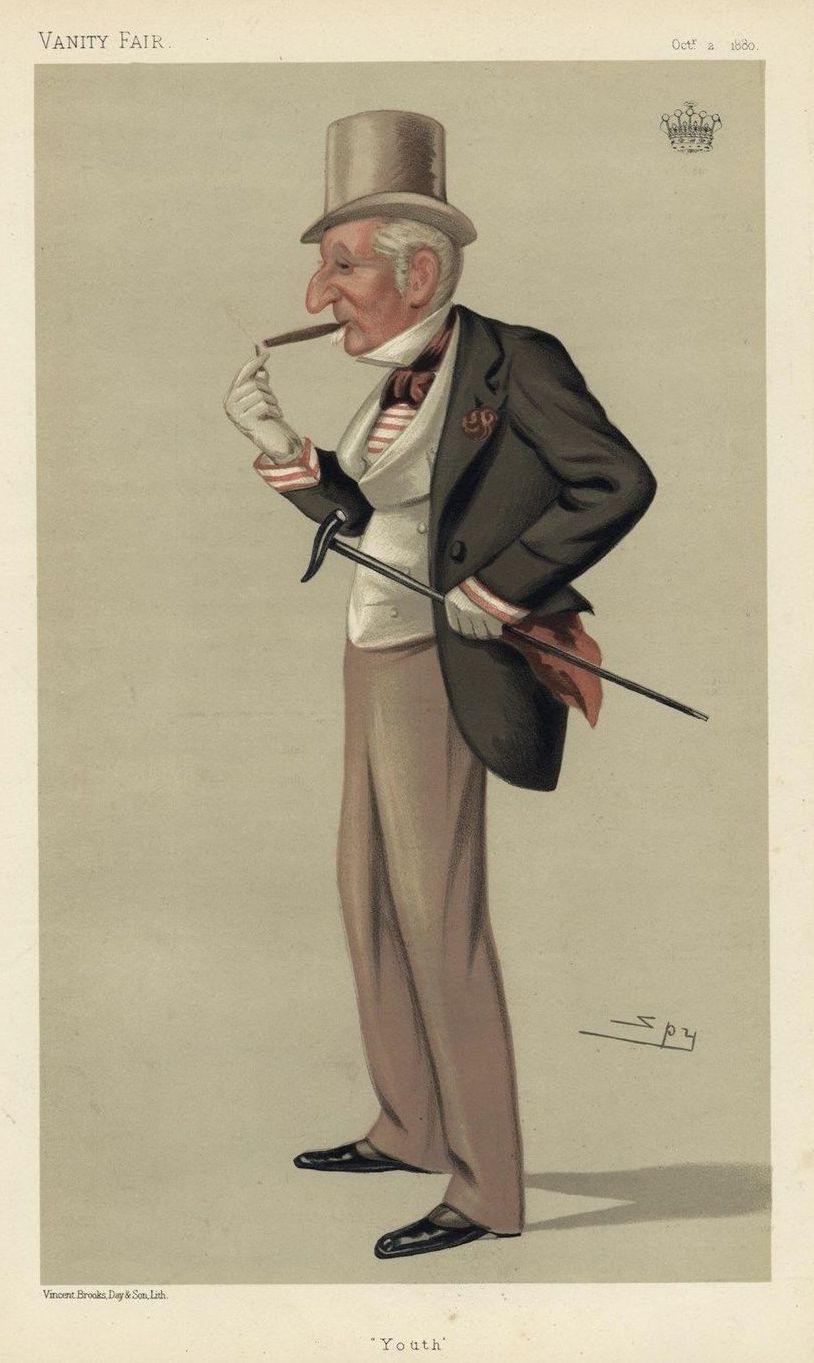
Caricature of the Earl by Leslie Ward in Vanity Fair, October 1880

Parliament of the United Kingdom
Preceded by Lord Brudenell; Thomas Philip Maunsell	Member of Parliament for Northamptonshire North; 1837 – 1841; With: Thomas Philip Maunsell	Succeeded by Thomas Philip Maunsell; Augustus Stafford
Peerage of England
Preceded by George Finch-Hatton	Earl of Winchilsea; 1858–1887	Succeeded by Murray Finch-Hatton
Preceded by George Finch-Hatton	Earl of Nottingham; 7th creation 1858–1887	Succeeded by Murray Finch-Hatton
