= Georgiana Finch-Hatton, Countess of Winchilsea =

The Right Honourable The Countess of Winchilsea and Nottingham
- Born: Lady Georgiana Charlotte Graham; 3 June 1791; Petersham, London
- Died: 13 February 1835 (aged 43); Haverholme Priory, Lincolnshire
- Spouse: George Finch-Hatton, 10th Earl of Winchilsea (m. 1814)
- Children: George Finch-Hatton, 11th Earl of Winchilsea; Lady Caroline Finch-Hatton
- Parent(s): James Graham, 3rd Duke of Montrose; Lady Caroline Maria Montagu
- Relatives: Elizabeth Montagu, Duchess of Manchester (grandmother); George Montagu, 4th Duke of Manchester (grandfather)

Georgiana Charlotte Finch-Hatton (or Finch), Countess of Winchilsea (3 June 1791 – 13 February 1835), formerly Lady Georgiana Charlotte Graham, was the first wife of George Finch-Hatton, 10th Earl of Winchilsea.

== Early life ==
She was born at Petersham, the daughter of James Graham, 3rd Duke of Montrose, and his wife, Caroline Maria Montagu, daughter of 4th Duke of Manchester and Elizabeth Dashwood. Georgiana's siblings included Lucy Herbert, Countess of Powis, Lady Emily Foley and James Graham, 4th Duke of Montrose.

Her paternal grandparents were William Graham, 2nd Duke of Montrose and the former Lady Lucy Manners (daughter of John Manners, 2nd Duke of Rutland).

Her other relations included her mother's first cousin, Duchess of Marlborough (through Dashwoods) and her mother's first cousin once removed 9th Duke of Hamilton (through the Spencers). Her maternal uncle the 5th Duke of Manchester was married to Lady Susan Gordon, sister to the famous Duchess of Richmond and Duchess of Bedford, all daughters of 4th Duke of Gordon and the ambitious Duchess of Gordon. The younger sister of Lucy's husband was the Duchess of Northumberland. Her second cousin was the Archbishop of Canterbury.

=== Ancestry ===
Ancestors of Lady Georgiana Charlotte

8. James Graham, 1st Duke of Montrose
4. William Graham, 2nd Duke of Montrose
9. Lady Christian Carnegie
2. James Graham, 3rd Duke of Montrose
10. John Manners, 2nd Duke of Rutland
5. Lady Lucy Manners
11. Hon. Lucy Sherard
Lady Georgiana Charlotte Graham
12. Robert Montagu, 3rd Duke of Manchester
6. George Montagu, 4th Duke of Manchester
13. Harriet Dunch
3. Lady Caroline Montagu
14. James Dashwood, 2nd Baronet
7. Elizabeth Dashwood
15. Elizabeth Spencer

== Personal life ==
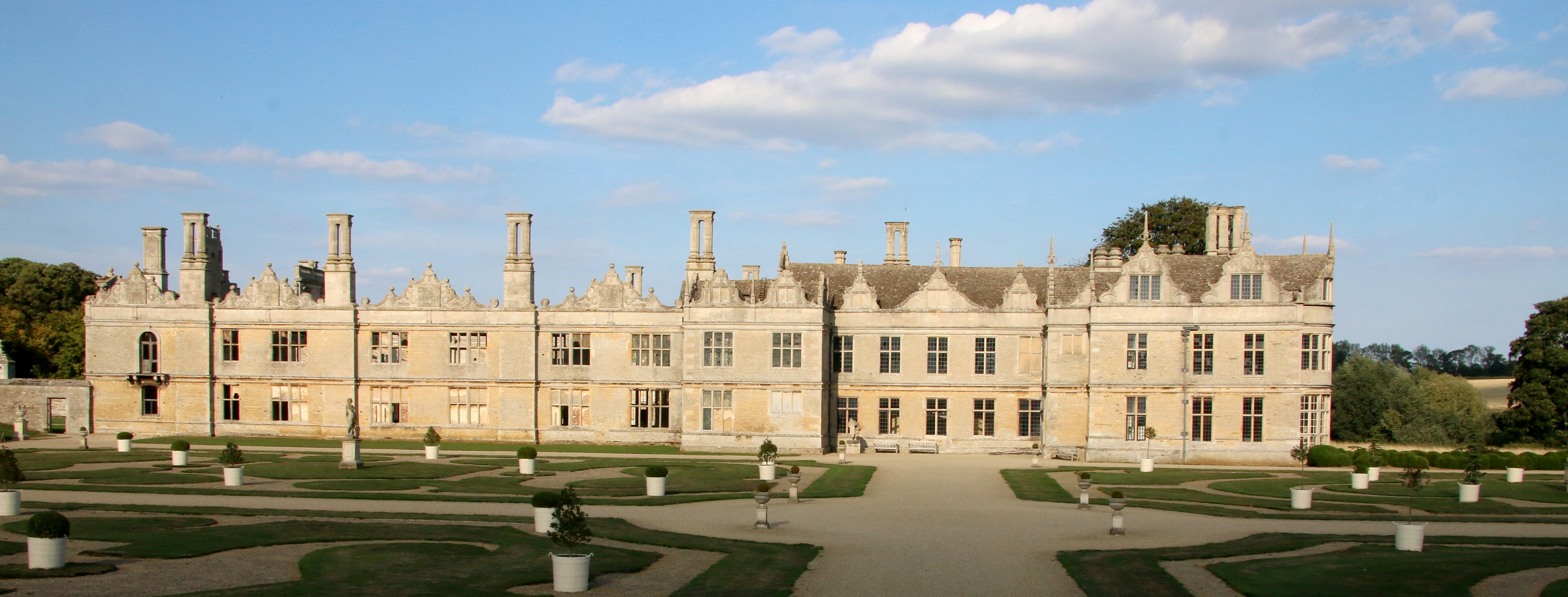
Kirby Hall, Northamptonshire

She married George William Finch-Hatton (later 10th Earl of Winchilsea), grandson of the 7th Earl of Winchilsea and eldest son of George Finch-Hatton esq and Lady Elizabeth Murray, on 26 July 1814, at Lambeth Palace. The ceremony was performed by the Archbishop of Canterbury. They had two children:

- George Finch-Hatton, 11th Earl of Winchilsea (1815–1887)
- Lady Caroline Finch-Hatton (1817–1888), who married Christopher Turnor and had children

After Lady Georgiana Charlotte's marriage to George, she was described by Fanny Catherine Austen Knight as “a sweet little perfection.”

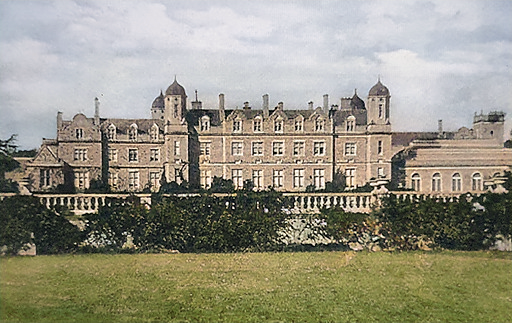
Eastwell Park, Kent

Her mother, the Duchess of Montrose visited her and George's new home at Kirby Hall. The newly wed settled at Kirby Hall, until her husband inherited Eastwell Park in 1823 from his father, and Haverholme Priory from his uncle in law in 1831, according to their grandchild, the will from this uncle in law was odd as it required the 10th Earl to live at Haverholme for majority of the year.

Her husband became 10th Earl of Winchilsea and 5th Earl of Nottingham in 1826 after his cousin died unmarried, making Lady Georgiana Countess of Winchilsea and Nottingham.

Lady Winchilsea was described as having the most amiable character, her kindness to the surrounding poor knew no bounds. Hundreds of people come to witness her later funeral.

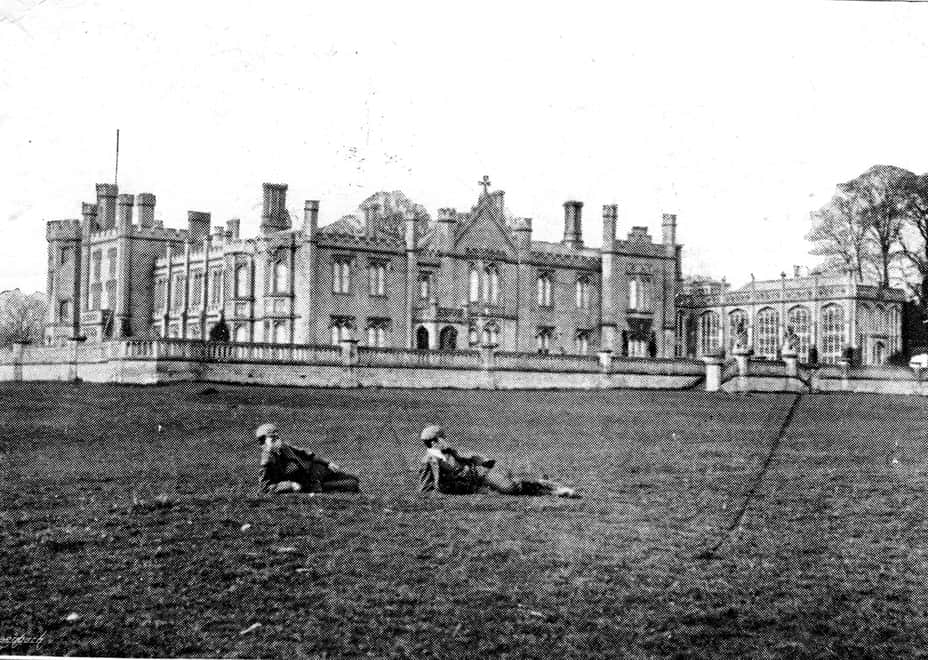
Haverholme Priory, Lincolnshire

She died at Haverholme Priory in Lincolnshire, a house rebuilt by the earl in 1830 and thereafter used as a family home. She was buried at nearby Ewerby.

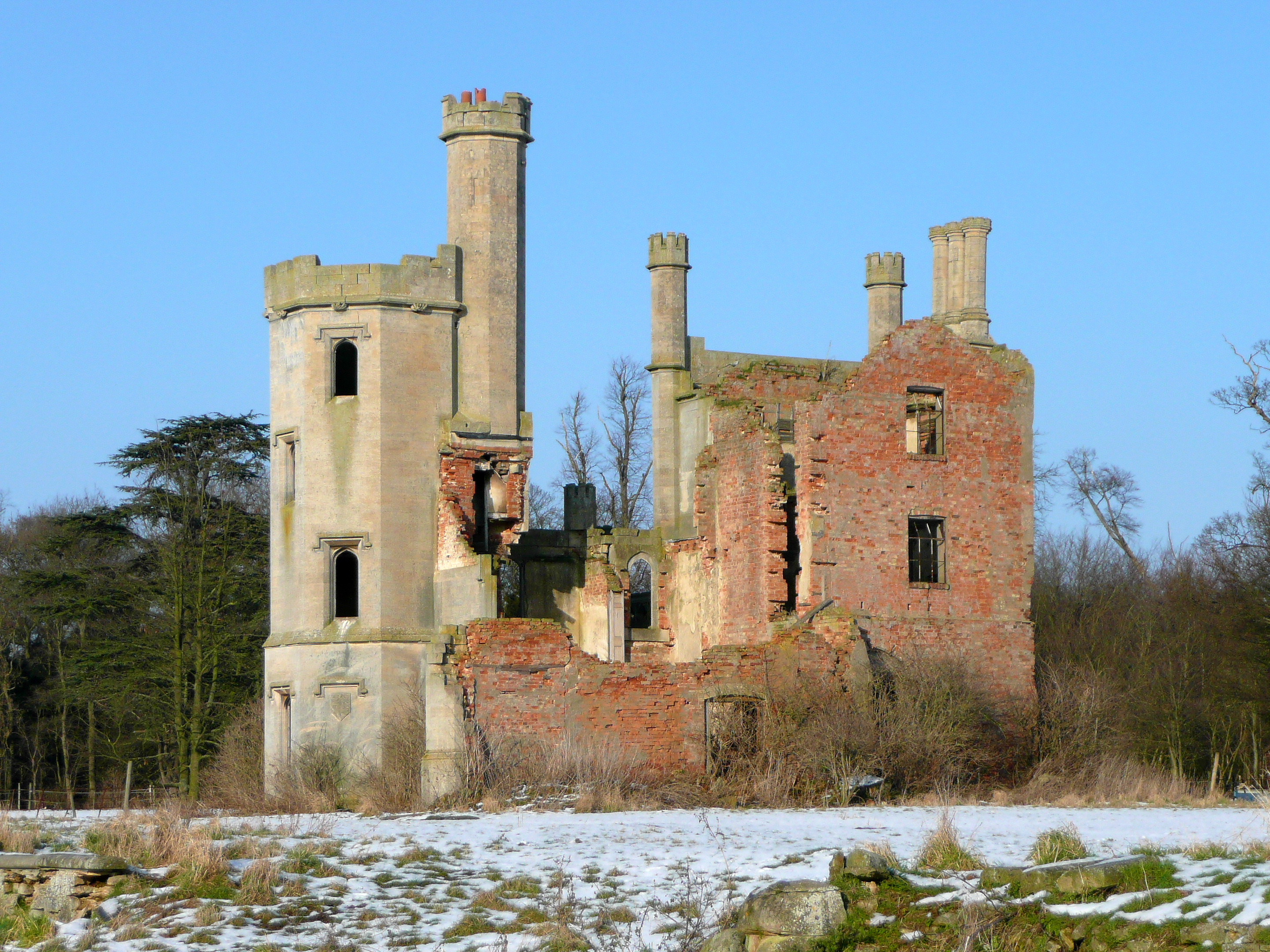
Ruins of Haverholme Priory
