= Constance Finch-Hatton, Countess of Winchilsea =

English countess (1823–1878)

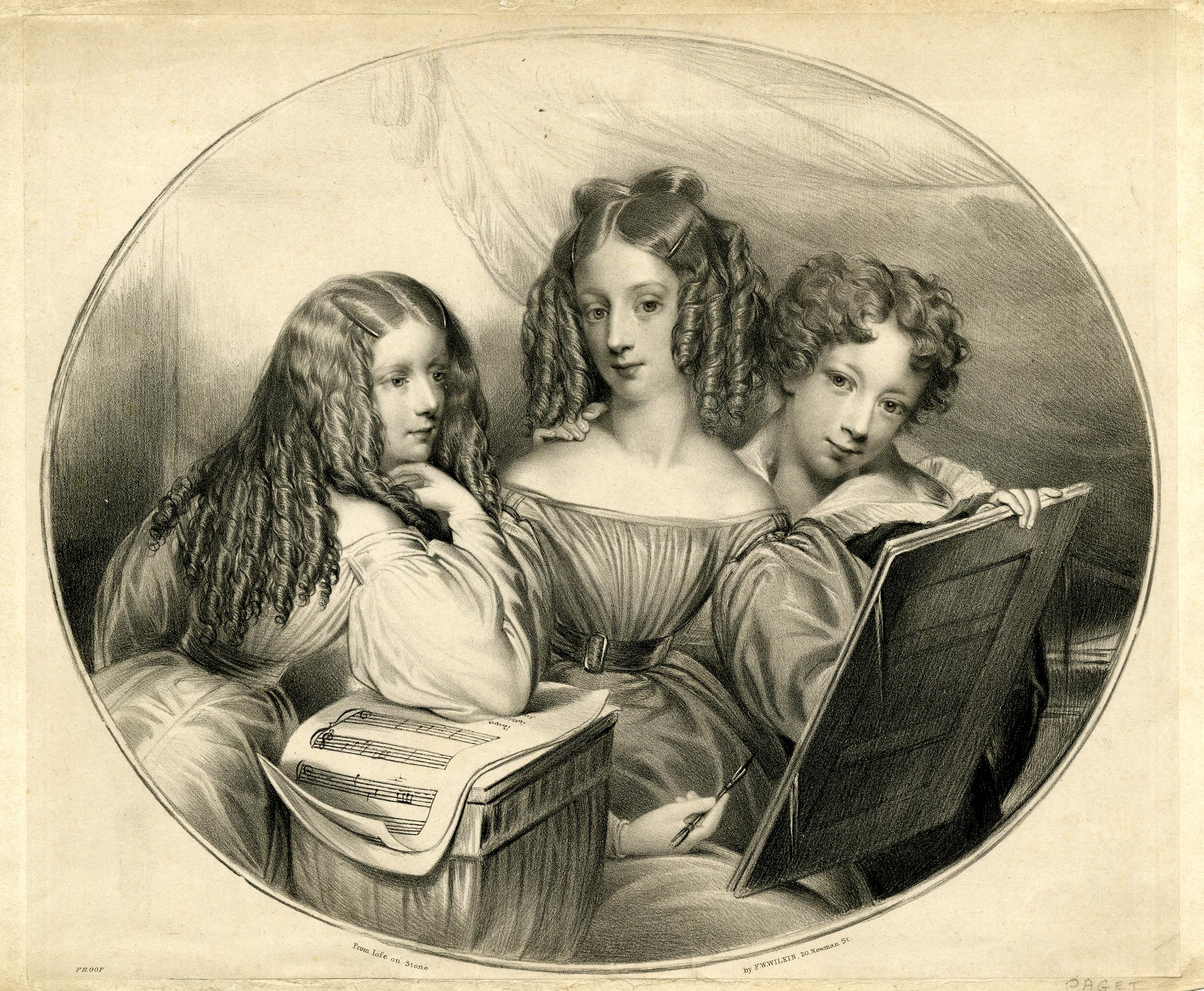
Lady Constance Henrietta and her siblings, Lady Eleanora Caroline and 3rd Marquess of Anglesey.

Constance Henrietta Finch-Hatton, Countess of Winchilsea and Nottingham (née Paget; 22 January 1823 – 5 March 1878) was the first wife of George Finch-Hatton, 11th Earl of Winchilsea.

Constance was born in St George Hanover Square, the daughter of Henry Paget, 2nd Marquess of Anglesey, and his wife, the former Eleanora Campbell, niece of the 6th and 7th Dukes of Argyll. A portrait of her as a child, with her brother, Henry, and sister, Eleanora, was painted by Francis William Wilkin.

Her grandmother, Lady Caroline Villiers who married firstly to her grandfather Henry Paget, 1st Marquess of Anglesey, divorced then remarried to her great-uncle, 6th Duke of Argyll.

She married the earl on 6 August 1846, before he inherited the earldom, when he was known as Viscount Maidstone. Their children were:

- Lady Mabel Emily Finch-Hatton (1849–1872), who married William George Eden, 4th Baron Auckland (1829–1890) and had no children
- Lady Constance Eleanora Caroline Finch-Hatton (1851–1910), who married Hon. Frederick Charles Howard (1840–1893), the son of Henry Howard, 2nd Earl of Effingham, and had children
- George Finch-Hatton, Viscount Maidstone (1852–1879), who married Louisa Augusta Jenkinson and predeceased his father, aged 27, without children
- Lady Hilda Jane Sophia Finch-Hatton (1856–1893), who married Henry Vincent Higgins and had no children

Finch-Hatton became Earl of Winchilsea and Nottingham on the death of his father, George Finch-Hatton, 10th Earl of Winchilsea, in 1857, at which point his wife became a countess. However, within a few years the earl was in financial difficulties, and they were forced to vacate the family home at Eastwell Park, Kent. She died in their London home at Victoria Street, Westminster, aged about 47.

Ancestors of Lady Constance Paget

8. Henry Paget, 1st Earl of Uxbridge
4. Henry Paget, 1st Marquess of Anglesey
9. Jane Champagné
2. Henry Paget, 2nd Marquess of Anglesey
10. George Villiers, 4th Earl of Jersey
5. Lady Caroline Villiers
11. Frances Twysden
Lady Constance Paget
12. William Campbell
6. John Campbell
13. Eleanora Ker
3. Eleanora Campbell
14. John Campbell, 5th Duke of Argyll
7. Lady Charlotte Campbell
15. Elizabeth Gunning
