= George Finch-Hatton, 10th Earl of Winchilsea =

English politician

The Right Honourable The Earl of Winchilsea
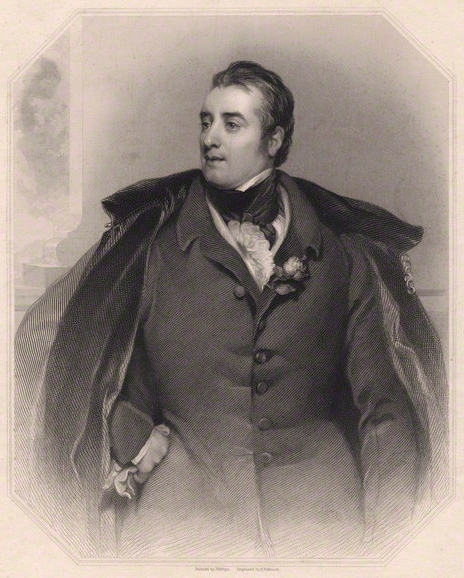
- Predecessor: George Finch
- Successor: George Finch-Hatton
- Born: George William Finch-Hatton; 19 May 1791; Kirby Hall, Northamptonshire
- Died: 8 January 1858 (aged 66); Haverholme Priory, Lincolnshire, UK
- Spouses: Lady Georgiana Graham (m. 1814; died 1835); Emily Bagot (m. 1837; died 1848); Fanny Royd Rice (m. 1849)
- Issue: George, 11th Earl of Winchilsea; Lady Caroline Turnor; Murray, 12th Earl of Winchilsea; Henry, 13th Earl of Winchilsea; Evelyn Upton, Viscountess Templetown; Hon. Harold Finch-Hatton
- Parents: George Finch-Hatton; Lady Elizabeth Murray

Arms of Finch:Argent, a chevron between three griffins passant sable. Arms of Hatton (blue) : Argent, a chevron between three garbs gules.

George William Finch-Hatton, 10th Earl of Winchilsea, 5th Earl of Nottingham (19 May 1791 – 8 January 1858) was an English peer and politician known for participating in the Wellington–Winchilsea duel with the then Prime Minister, Arthur Wellesley, 1st Duke of Wellington, in 1829.

== Early life ==
Finch Hatton, born at Kirby Hall, Northamptonshire, on 19 May 1791, was grandson of Hon. Edward Finch, youngest son of Daniel Finch, 7th Earl of Winchilsea and son of George Finch-Hatton of Eastwell Park, by his wife whom he married in 1785, Lady Elizabeth Murray, eldest daughter of David Murray, 2nd Earl of Mansfield and great niece of William Murray, 1st Earl of Mansfield.

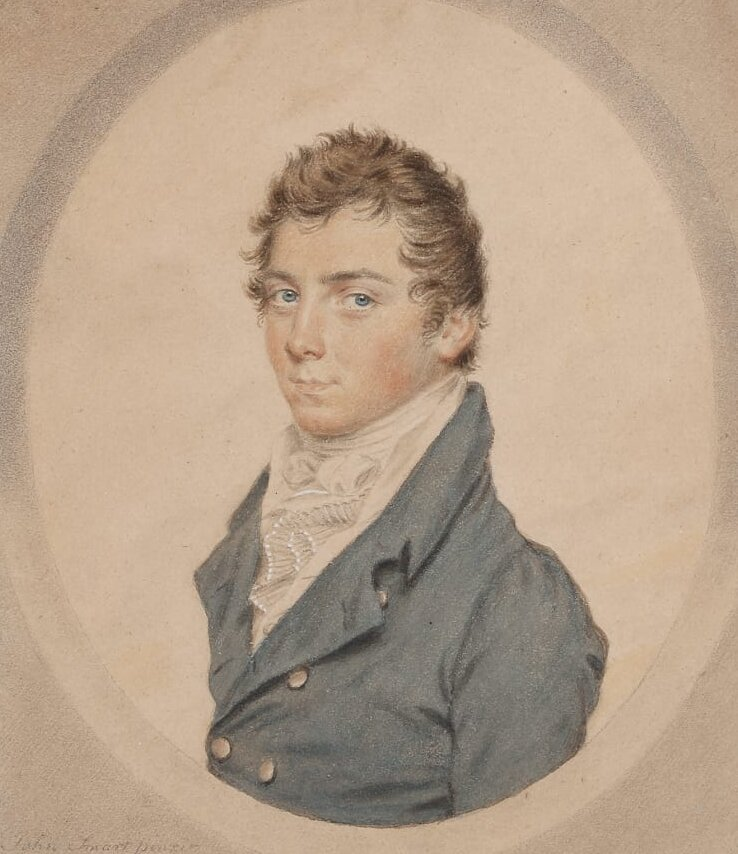
The miniature portrait of George William FH or his brother was one of the last painted by notable miniaturist John Smart, who died in London in 1811.

The author Jane Austen described him in 1805 then aged 14 as "a fine boy, and well behaved", he played a game of cribbage with Austen at Eastwell. There's a letter from the Austen collection that states:

all the young ladies were in love with George Hatton - he was very handsome and agreeable, danced very well, and flirted famously ... those who knew the warm hearted generosity of his nature, the sterling worth of his character, will not be surprised that he enjoyed popularity in his youth.

George William was educated at Westminster School and Christ's College, Cambridge, where he proceeded B.A. in 1812.

On 13 October 1809 he became a captain in the 1st East Kent or Ashford, Oldcastle and Elham Regiment of Local Militia, on 14 December 1819 he commenced acting as a lieutenant of the Northamptonshire regiment of yeomanry, and on 7 September 1820 he was named a deputy-lieutenant for the county of Kent. His cousin, George Finch, 9th Earl of Winchilsea and fourth earl of Nottingham, having died on 2 August 1826, succeeded to these peerages.

George had an estimated income of £27,000 a year.

== House of Lords ==
He presided at a very large and influential meeting held on Penenden Heath, Kent, on 10 October 1828, when strongly worded resolutions in favour of Protestant principles were carried. In the House of Lords, he violently opposed almost every liberal measure which was brought forward. He was particularly noted as being almost the only English nobleman who was willing to identify himself with the Orange party in Ireland, and he was accustomed to denouncing in frantic terms Daniel O'Connell and the system of education carried out in St Patrick's College, Maynooth.

Occasionally he took the chair at May meetings at Exeter Hall, but his intemperate language prevented him from becoming a leader in evangelical politics.

The Roman Catholic Relief Bill 1829 encountered his most vehement hostility, and ultimately led to a duel with his fellow Tory, the Duke of Wellington. Lord Winchilsea, in a letter to the secretary of King's College London, wrote that the duke, "under the cloak of some coloured show of zeal for the Protestant religion, carried on an insidious design for the infringement of our liberties and the introduction of popery into every department of the state". The duke replied "I may lament that a nobleman who I feel the highest respect, entertains a bad opinion of me. But I don't complain as long as that opinion is not brought before me" and he further asked Lord Winchilsea to withdraw his statement, but Lord Winchilsea refused to do so and the duke said he had no choice but to challenge him to a duel.

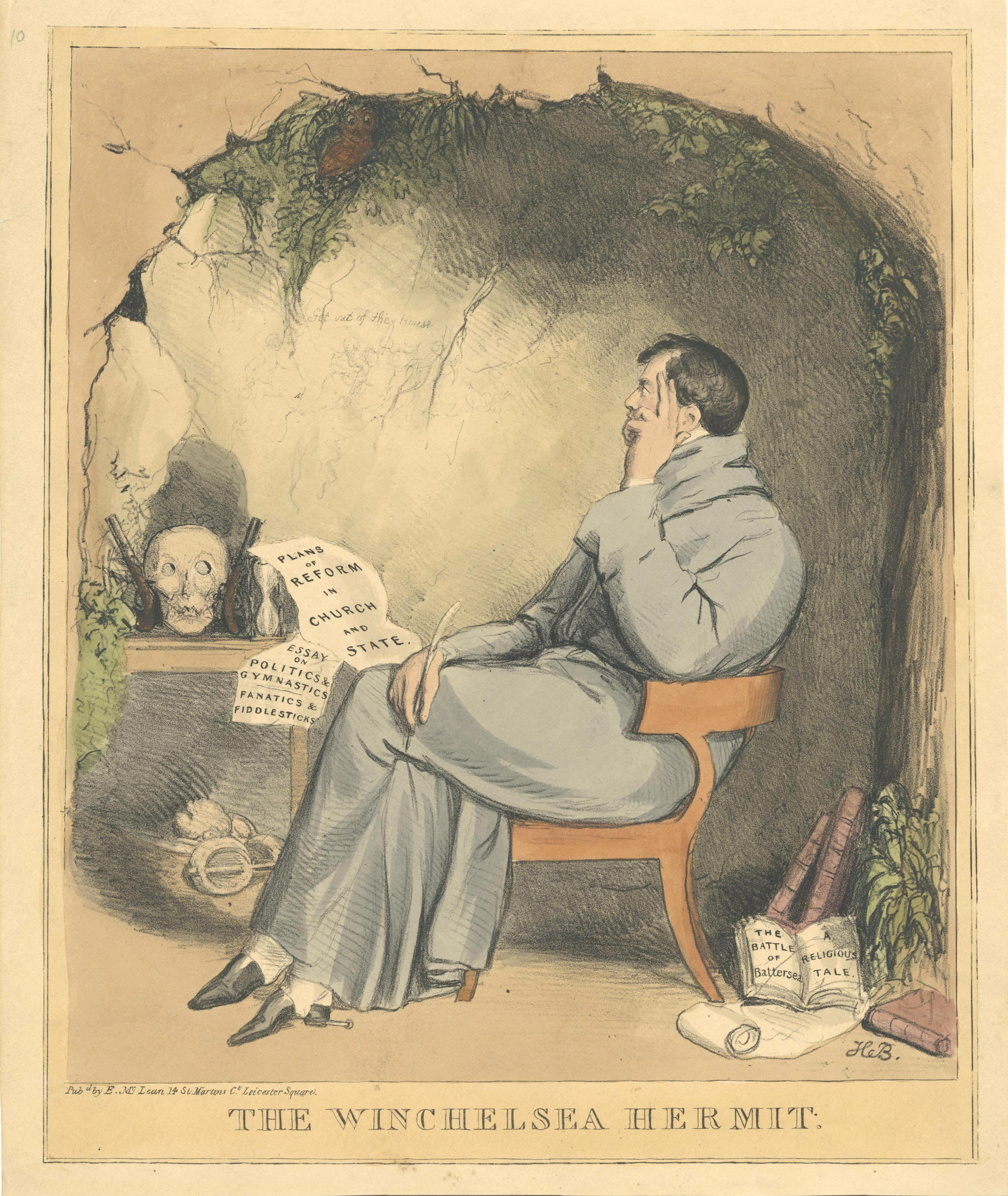
A satirical print showing the Earl in his dressing gown being a "Hermit" since he said he'd quit the house of Lords over the Catholic Bill.

The duel took place in Battersea Fields on 21 March 1829, the duke being attended by Sir Henry Hardinge, and Winchilsea by Edward Boscawen, 4th Viscount Falmouth. The duke fired and missed; he claimed he did so on purpose. However, the duke was known as a poor shot and accounts differ as to whether he purposefully missed. Winchilsea kept his arm by his side at the command to "fire" then quite deliberately raised his arm in the air and fired. He then apologised for the language of his letter. It is almost certain that Winchilsea and Falmouth had agreed on their course of action, as the letter of apology was already prepared.

He was a very frequent speaker in the Lords, and strenuously opposed the Reform Bill and other Whig measures. He was gazetted lieutenant-colonel commandant of the East Kent Yeomanry on 20 December 1830, named a deputy-lieutenant for the county of Lincoln on 26 September 1831, and created a D.C.L. at Oxford on 10 June 1834.

== Personal life ==
Winchilsea was married three times:

1. Lady Georgiana Charlotte Graham, on 26 July 1814 at Lambeth Palace, eldest daughter of James Graham, 3rd Duke of Montrose and Lady Caroline Montagu, daughter of 4th Duke of Manchester and Duchess of Manchester. Georgiana was related to some of the most prominent aristocratic families. Their wedding was attended by their respective parents and 9th Earl of Winchilsea. She died at Haverholme on 13 February 1835. Together they had:
  1. George Finch-Hatton, 11th Earl of Winchilsea (1815–1887)
  2. Lady Caroline Finch-Hatton (c1817–1888) m. Christopher Turnor of Stoke Rochford Hall, had issue.
2. Emily Georgiana Bagot, on 15 February 1837, second daughter of Sir Charles Bagot, G.C.B. and Lady Mary Anne Wellesley (niece of Duke of Wellington), their wedding was witnessed by the Duke of Wellington, Earl of Mornington, Lord Stormont, and more. Queen Adelaide gifted her a handsome jewelry as a wedding gift. Lady Winchilsea died at Haverholme Priory on 10 July 1848.
3. Fanny Margaretta Rice, on 17 October 1849 at Godmersham Park, eldest daughter of Edward Royd Rice of Dane Court, Kent and his wife Elizabeth Austen. She died on 26 April 1909. She is a great-niece of Jane Austen through Elizabeth Austen, daughter of Edward Austen Knight. Together they had:
  1. Murray Finch-Hatton, 12th Earl of Winchilsea (1851–1898)
  2. Henry Finch-Hatton, 13th Earl of Winchilsea (1852–1927), father of Guy F-H, 14th Earl and Denys Finch Hatton
  3. Lady Evelyn Georgiana Finch-Hatton (1854–1932) m. 4th Viscount Templetown
  4. Harold Finch-Hatton (1856–1904)

His first son, George James (later 11th Earl of Winchilsea) was baptized in 1815 by the Archbishop of Canterbury at his home in Manchester Square. Among the guests were the Duke and Duchess of Montrose, Dowager Duchess of Manchester, his parents George and Lady Elizabeth Finch-Hatton, Marquess and Marchioness of Camden, and the 9th Earl of Winchilsea.

Hatton's father died on 17 February 1823, his mother Lady Elizabeth died just 2 years later, George inherited his father's estates including Kirby Hall and his childhood home Eastwell Park.

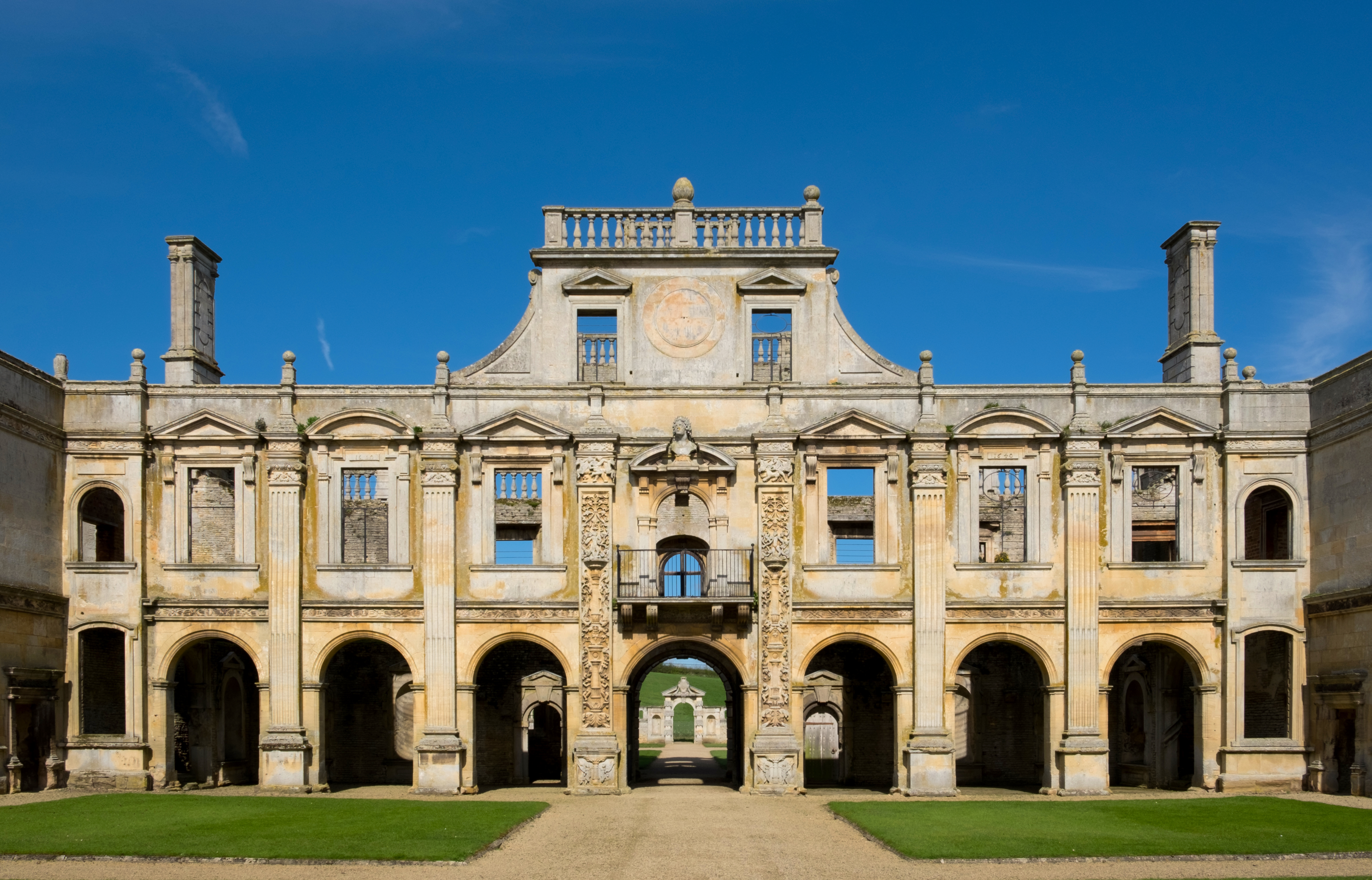
Kirby Hall, Northamptonshire

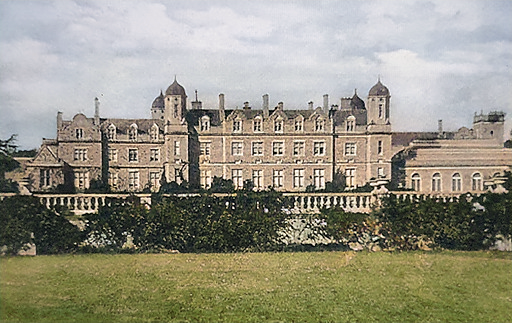
Eastwell Park, Kent

His 1st cousin, George Finch, 9th Earl of Winchilsea died on 2 August 1826 with no legitimate heir as he never married. Therefore George Finch Hatton succeeded to his grandfather's title as the 10th Earl of Winchilsea, but his 1st cousin the 9th Earl had cheated him out of their grandfather the 7th Earl of Winchilsea's wealth and lavish country estates which surprisingly was not entailed, he instead gave all the families wealth and family house to his own illegitimate child George Finch. Since then the lavish Winchilsea and Nottingham ancestral seat Burley on the Hill was no longer home to Earl of Winchilsea and Earl of Nottingham.

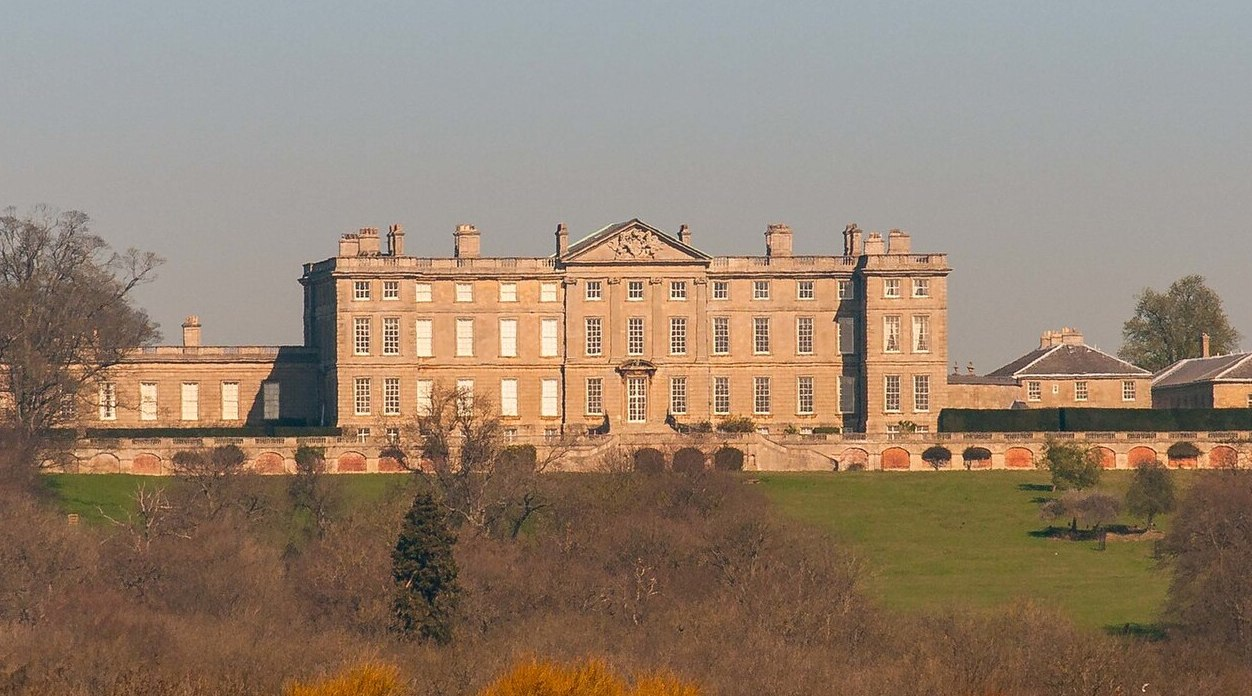
Burley on the hill House, Rutland

In May 1831, George inherited extensive properties including Haverholme Priory from his late uncle in law Sir Jenison Gordon who had married his aunt Harriet Finch-Hatton but had no children together, therefore his estates which at the time were described by The Times as “extensive”, passed to George. During Sir Jenison's occupancy of Haverholme Priory, he already had made substantial additions and improvements to the house, “and in a style corresponding to the circumstances of the place”. His uncle in law made a provision that he need to live at Haverholme for parts of the year, the expense of running multiple houses was immense, so he was forced to abandon Kirby Hall.

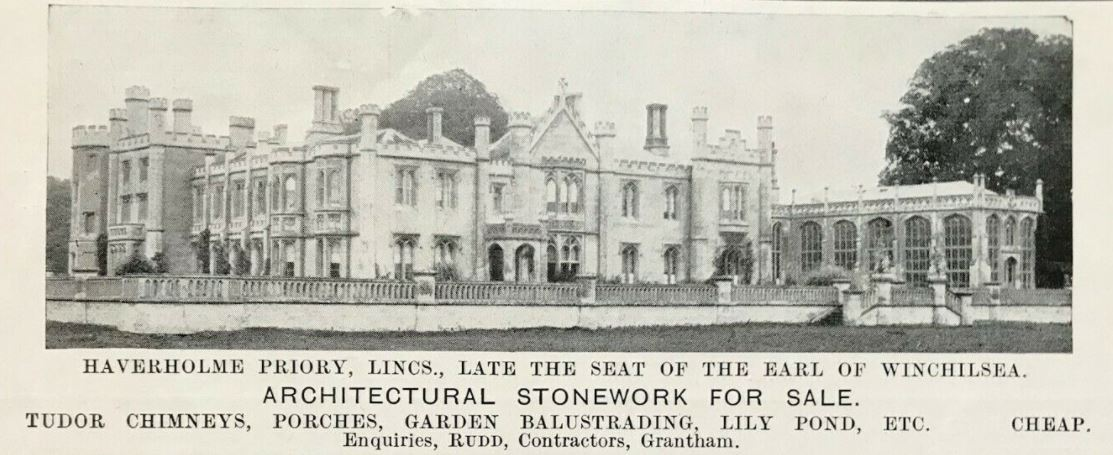
Haverholme Priory, Lincolnshire

His London residence was on 20 Wilton Crescent, Belgravia. George lived here with his wife Fanny Margaretta, they were attended by 10 servants.

=== Social life ===
In 1828, Young future Queen Victoria and her mother, Duchess of Kent paid a visit to Lord Winchilsea and stayed for two days at Eastwell Park, before their return to Kensington Palace.

In 1831 at St James's Palace, Lord Winchilsea presented his brother the Rev. Daniel Heneage Finch-Hatton to the King, on being appointed chaplain in ordinary to his majesty. In April, his wife presented his sister Anna Maria Finch-Hatton at court.

In 1832, The Duke of Wellington dined at Eastwell Park with Lord Winchilsea after his review of the Kentish Yeomanry. There was a big celebration with his lordship setting up a marquee to seat 400 people for dinner in front of his house.

In 1835, Lord Winchilsea accompanied by his daughter, Lady Caroline visited Chatsworth House and later his friend, the 4th Duke of Newcastle in Wales. Upon returning, Lord Winchilsea was received with great joy by his tenants and the poor in the neighbourhood of Eastwell Park.

Lord Winchilsea was one of the favourite of King William IV and was frequently invited to royal events, he was present during the King's birthday dinner on August 1836 at Windsor Castle, where the King famously shouted at the Duchess of Kent over future Queen Victoria.

In March 1836, Lord Winchilsea and his daughter, Lady Caroline attended the Duchess of Kent's Grand Dinner and Concert, the event was also attended by Winchilsea's uncle, the 3rd Earl of Mansfield. In November, Lord Winchilsea and Lord Rosslyn was part of the circle entertained by the Duke of Wellington at Walmer Castle.

In May 1837, Lord and Lady Winchilsea left Wilton Crescent to visit The King and Queen at Windsor Castle. In November, Lord Winchilsea attended Duke of Wellington's Grand Dinner at Apsley House.

In Nov 1838, he hosted the Duke of Wellington, Earl of Cardigan, Lord Maryborough, etc, to a week of hunting retreat at Eastwell Park mansion.

In 1844, The 2nd Marquess of Exeter invited Lady Caroline and her uncle Rev. Daniel Finch-Hatton, alongside their spouses, Christopher Turnor and Lady Louisa Greville, to a banquet of limited sets at Burghley House for Queen Victoria and Prince Albert's visit there. They sat at the dinner table with the Queen.

Lord Winchilsea's obituary, described his appearance as being tall and stout, his face as round and animated, with a pleasant and dignified expression, his complexion was dark, his hair black, and his features small and regular.

=== Death ===
George died at Haverholme Priory, near Sleaford, Lincolnshire, 8 January 1858. He left his main estate worth £20,000 a year to his first son George James, 11th Earl of Winchilsea, while he left Haverholme estate worth £7,000 a year to his second son Murray (later 12th Earl of Winchilsea).

=== Influence ===
He was the writer of a pamphlet entitled Earl of Winchilsea's Letter to the "Times", calling upon the Protestants of Great Britain to unite heart and soul in addressing the Throne for a Dissolution of Parliament, 1851.

He was responsible for the phrase Kentish Fire meaning prolonged derisive cheering.

Through his daughter Lady Caroline Turnor (née Finch Hatton), he was the ancestor of Neil Edmund McCorquodale, who married Princess Diana's eldest sister Lady Sarah Spencer, they had 3 children together, all of whom are 1st cousin to Prince William and Prince Harry.

== Ancestry ==
Ancestors of George William Finch-Hatton, 10th Earl of Winchilsea

8. Daniel Finch, 7th Earl of Winchilsea
4. Hon. Edward Finch-Hatton
9. Hon. Anne Hatton
2. George Finch-Hatton
10. Sir Thomas Palmer, 4th Baronet, of Wingham
5. Anne Palmer
11. Elizabeth Marsham
George Finch-Hatton, 10th Earl of Winchilsea
12. David Murray, 6th Viscount of Stormont
6. David Murray, 2nd Earl of Mansfield
13. Anne Stewart
3. Lady Elizabeth Murray
14. Imperial Count Heinrich von Bünau
7. Imperial Countess Henrietta von Bünau

Peerage of England
Preceded by George Finch	Earl of Winchilsea; 1826–1858	Succeeded by George Finch-Hatton
Preceded by George Finch	Earl of Nottingham; 7th creation 1826–1858	Succeeded by George Finch-Hatton
