= Caroline Graham, Duchess of Montrose =

Her Grace The Duchess of Montrose
- Born: Caroline Montagu; 10 August 1770
- Died: 24 March 1847 (aged 76); Petersham, Surrey
- Spouse: James Graham, 3rd Duke of Montrose (m. 1790)
- Issue: 6, including: Georgiana Finch-Hatton, Countess of Winchilsea; Lady Emily Foley; Lucy Herbert, Countess of Powis; James Graham, 4th Duke of Montrose
- Parents: George Montagu, 4th Duke of Manchester; Elizabeth Dashwood

Caroline Maria Graham (née Montagu), Duchess of Montrose (10 August 1770 – 24 March 1847) was the second wife of James Graham, 3rd Duke of Montrose. She was a daughter of George Montagu, 4th Duke of Manchester, by his wife Elizabeth Dashwood.

She married Montrose on 24 July 1790, at Kensington Palace.

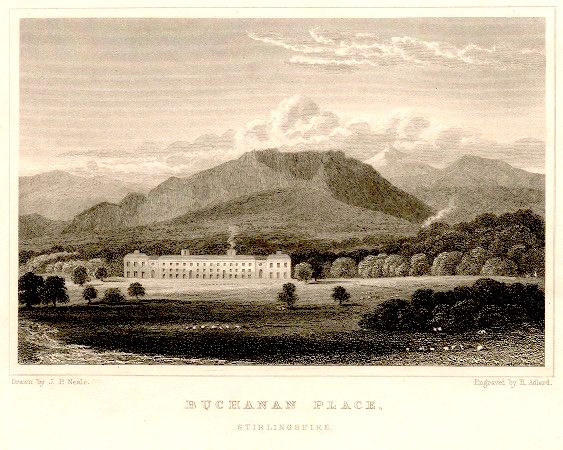
Buchanan Place, seats of Duke and Duchess of Montrose c.1822

He was fifteen years her senior, and had previously been married to Lady Jemima Elizabeth, daughter of John Ashburnham, 2nd Earl of Ashburnham; their only child had died in infancy.

The duke and duchess had six children:

- Lady Georgiana Charlotte Graham (died 1835), who married George William Finch, 10th Earl of Winchilsea, and had children
- Lady Emily Graham (died 1900), who married Edward Thomas Foley and had no children
- Lady Caroline Graham (died 1875), who died unmarried
- Lady Lucy Graham (1793–1875), who married Edward Herbert, 2nd Earl of Powis, and had children
- James Graham, 4th Duke of Montrose (1799–1874), who succeeded his father in the dukedom
- Lord Montagu William Graham (1807–1878), who married Hon. Harriet Anne Bateman-Hanbury and had no children.

The duke, prior to his second marriage, had been a lover of the notorious Seymour Fleming, Lady Worsley, who, in February 1782, was the subject of a criminal conversation case for £20,000 (2015: £2,110,000), brought by her husband against Maurice George Bisset. Lady Worsley retaliated with scandalous revelations, and her doctor, William Osborn, testified that she had suffered from a venereal disease which she had contracted from the Marquess of Graham. The case was presided by Lord Mansfield (great uncle of George William, 10th Earl of Winchilsea)

The duchess was allegedly one of the titled ladies who hissed at Queen Victoria in the royal enclosure at Ascot Racecourse in 1839, following the scandal over the queen's treatment of Lady Flora Hastings.

The duke died in 1836. The duchess died, aged 76, at Petersham, Surrey.

== Fictional portrayals ==
In the 2009 film The Young Victoria, the duchess is played by Alice Glover.
