= Kentish fire =

Derisive cheering

Kentish fire is vehement and prolonged derisive cheering. The practice is so called from indulgence in it in Kent at meetings to oppose the Roman Catholic Relief Bill (when passed, the Roman Catholic Relief Act 1829).

Kentish fire may also be rapturous applause, or three times three and one more. The expression originated with Lord Winchelsea, who proposed the health of the Earl of Roden, on 15 August 1834, and added, "Let it be given with the 'Kentish Fire'." In proposing another toast he asked permission to bring his "Kentish artillery" again into action. Chambers's Encyclopaedia says it arose from the protracted cheers given in Kent to the No-Popery orators in 1828–29.
