= List of ambassadors of Great Britain to France =

Ambassador of Great Britain to France L'Ambassadeur britannique en France
- Arms of Great Britain
- Style: His Excellency
- Residence: Paris
- Appointer: The monarch
- Inaugural holder: Charles Townshend, Viscount Townshend; First Ambassador of Great Britain to France (Plenipotentiary)
- Final holder: James Harris, Baron Malmesbury; Last Ambassador of Great Britain to France (Plenipotentiary)

The ambassador of Great Britain to France (French: L'Ambassadeur britannique en France) was the foremost diplomatic representative in France of the Kingdom of Great Britain, created by the Treaty of Union in 1707, in charge of the British diplomatic mission in France.

Traditionally, the embassy to France was the most prestigious posting in the English and later British foreign services, although in the eighteenth century there was sometimes no diplomatic representation between the two countries, due to the wars between them.

For ambassadors to France before 1707, see the list of ambassadors of the Kingdom of England to France.

For ambassadors to France after 1800, see the list of ambassadors from the United Kingdom to France.

== Ambassadors and ministers of Great Britain to France ==
- No permanent representation of the Kingdom of Great Britain, or of its predecessor the Kingdom of England, to France between 1701 and 1712, due to the War of the Spanish Succession.
  - 1709: Charles Townshend, Viscount Townshend Plenipotentiary
- 1712: The Duke of Hamilton (never took office, being killed in a celebrated duel before setting off)
  - 1712–1715: Matthew Prior, Plenipotentiary
- 1712–1713: The Duke of Shrewsbury
- 1714–1720: The Earl of Stair, Minister-Plenipotentiary 1714–1715; Envoy Extraordinary 1715; then Ambassador
- 1720–1721: Sir Robert Sutton, Ambassador
- 1721–1724: Sir Luke Schaub
- 1724–1730: The Lord Walpole of Wolterton Envoy Extraordinary 1724; Ambassador Extraordinary 1724–1727; Ambassador Extraordinary and Plenipotentiary 1727–1730
- 1730–1740: The Earl Waldegrave
- 1740–1744: Anthony Thompson, Chargé d'Affaires
- no representation 1744–1748 due to the War of the Austrian Succession
- 1749–1754: The Earl of Albemarle
- no representation 1754–1762 due to the Seven Years' War
  - 1761: Hans Stanley, Minister: special mission to negotiate peace
- 1762–1763: The Duke of Bedford
- 1763–1765: The Earl of Hertford
- 1765–1766: The Duke of Richmond
- 1766–1768: The Earl of Rochford
- 1768–1772: The Earl Harcourt
- 1772–1778: The Viscount Stormont
- no representation 1778–1782 due to American Revolutionary War
- 1782: Thomas Grenville, Minister
- 1782–1783: Alleyne FitzHerbert, Minister Plenipotentiary
- 1783–1784: The Duke of Manchester
- 1784–1789: John Frederick Sackville, 3rd Duke of Dorset, Ambassador Extraordinary and Plenipotentiary
  - 1789–1790: Embassy Secretary Lord Robert Stephen FitzGerald (1765–1833), son of James FitzGerald, 1st Duke of Leinster, acted as Minister Plenipotentiary from 8 August 1789 to 20 June 1790
- 1790–1792: Earl Gower, Ambassador Extraordinary and Plenipotentiary
- No representation after 1792, due to the French Revolutionary Wars. Diplomatic relations were severed until 1801.
  - 1797: James Harris, Baron Malmesbury, Plenipotentiary
