= Lucy Herbert, Countess of Powis =

Lucy Herbert, Countess of Powis (25 September 1793 – 16 September 1875), formerly Lady Lucy Graham, was the wife of Edward Herbert, 2nd Earl of Powis.

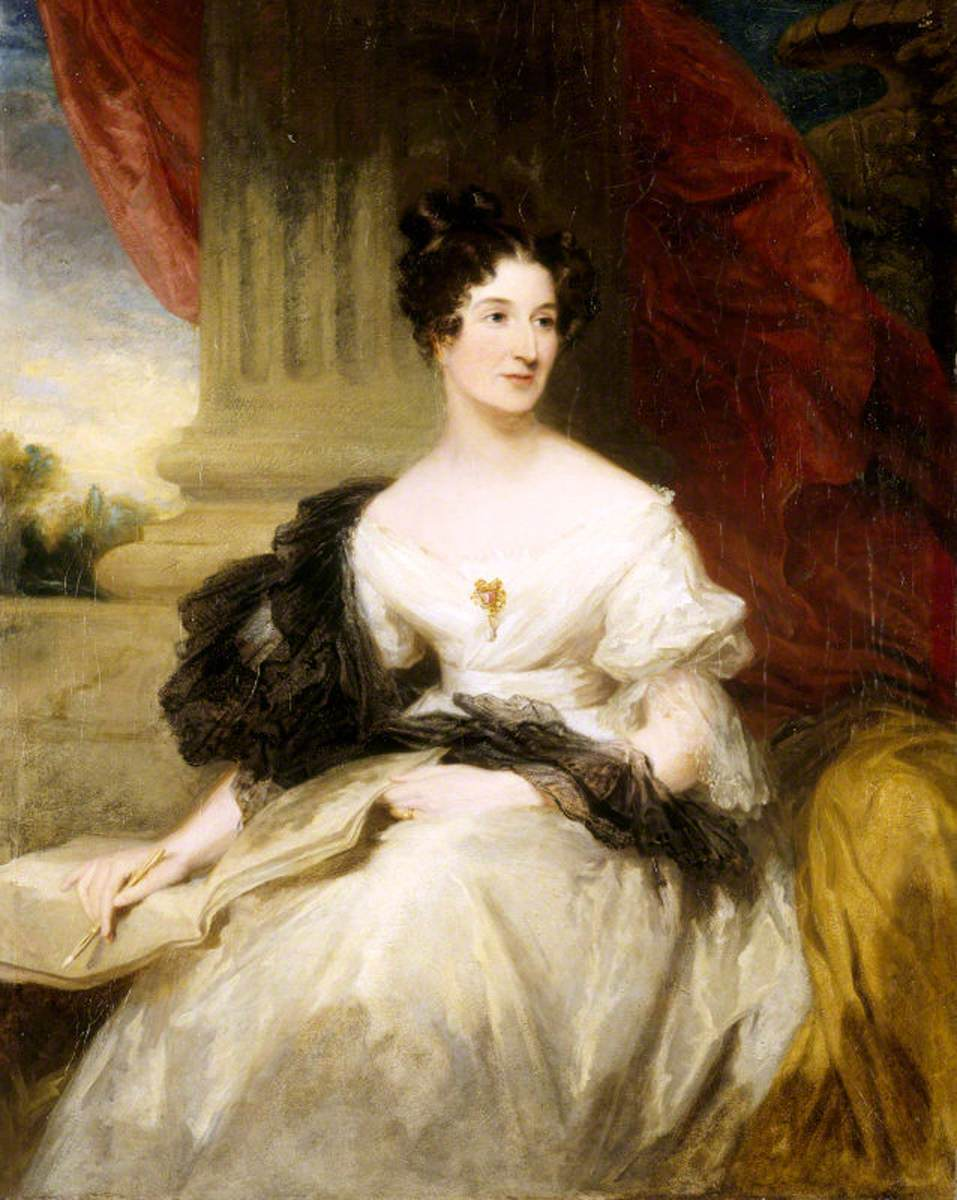
Lady Lucy Graham (1793–1875), Countess of Powis by Frederick Richard Say (1805-1868)

Lady Lucy was the daughter of James Graham, 3rd Duke of Montrose, and his wife, the former Lady Caroline Maria Montagu.

She married Edward Herbert, Viscount Clive on 9 February 1818. He succeeded to the Powis earldom in 1839, at which point Lucy became Countess of Powis. The couple had seven children:

- Unnamed daughter Herbert
- Edward James Herbert, 3rd Earl of Powis (1818–1891)
- Lady Lucy Caroline Herbert (c.1819–1884), who married Frederick Calvert and had no children
- Lady Charlotte Elizabeth Herbert (1821–1906), who married Hugh Montgomery and had children
- Lt.-Gen. Rt. Hon. Sir Percy Egerton Herbert (1822–1876), who married Lady Mary Caroline Louisa Thomas Petty-FitzMaurice and had children
- Very Rev. Hon. George Herbert (1825–1894), Dean of Hereford, who married Elizabeth Beatrice Sykes and had children
- Hon. Robert Charles Herbert (1827–1902), who married Anna Maria Cludde and had children
- Maj.-Gen. William Henry Herbert (1834–1909), who married Sybella Augusta Milbank and had children.

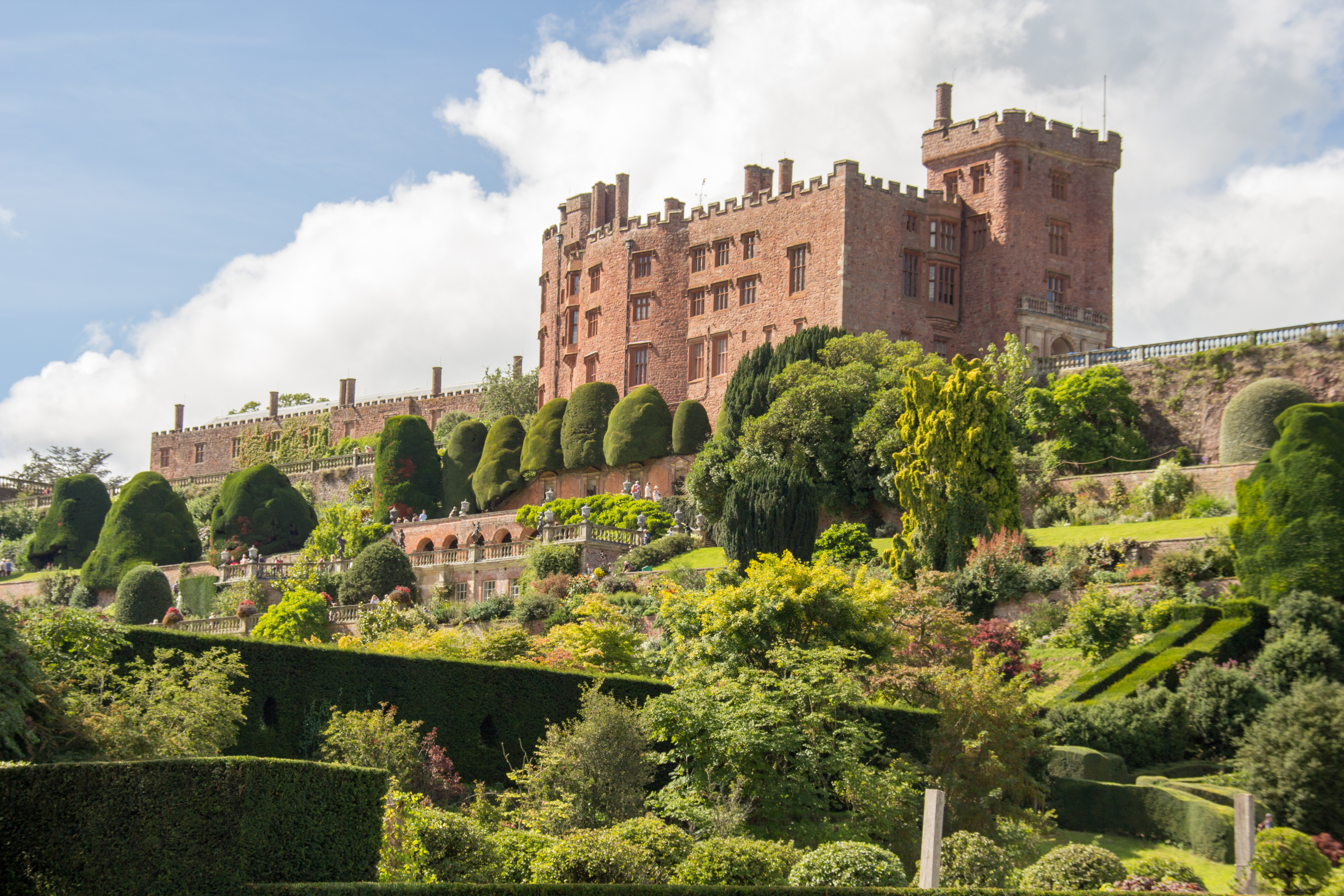
Powis Castle, Wales.

The Earl of Powis died on 17 January 1848 at his home in Powis Castle after being accidentally shot during a pheasant hunt by one of his sons, the Hon. George Herbert, ten days earlier. He was buried at St Mary's Parish Church, Welshpool. The countess herself died in 1875 at Walcot, Shropshire, where the family had another home.

A portrait of the countess, at around the time of her marriage, was painted by Frederick Richard Say and is held at Powis Castle.

A mineral collection donated to the National Museum of Wales in 1929 by George Charles Herbert, 4th Earl of Powis, Lucy's grandson, was for a time thought to have belonged to her, but was actually the collection made by her predecessor and mother in-law, Henrietta Clive, Countess of Powis.

== Arms ==
Coat of arms of Lucy Herbert, Countess of Powis
Coronet of an Earl. Escutcheon Edward Herbert, 2nd Earl of Powis (Argent on a fess Sable three mullets Or) impaling James Graham, 3rd Duke of Montrose (Quarterly 1st & 4th Or on a chief Sable three escallops Or 2nd & 3rd Argent three roses Gules barbed and seeded Proper). Supporters Dexter an elephant sinister a griffin wings expanded both Argent the latter powdered with mullets and ducally gorged Gules.
