= James Graham, 3rd Duke of Montrose =

British noble (1755–1836)

His Grace The Duke of Montrose KG KT PC
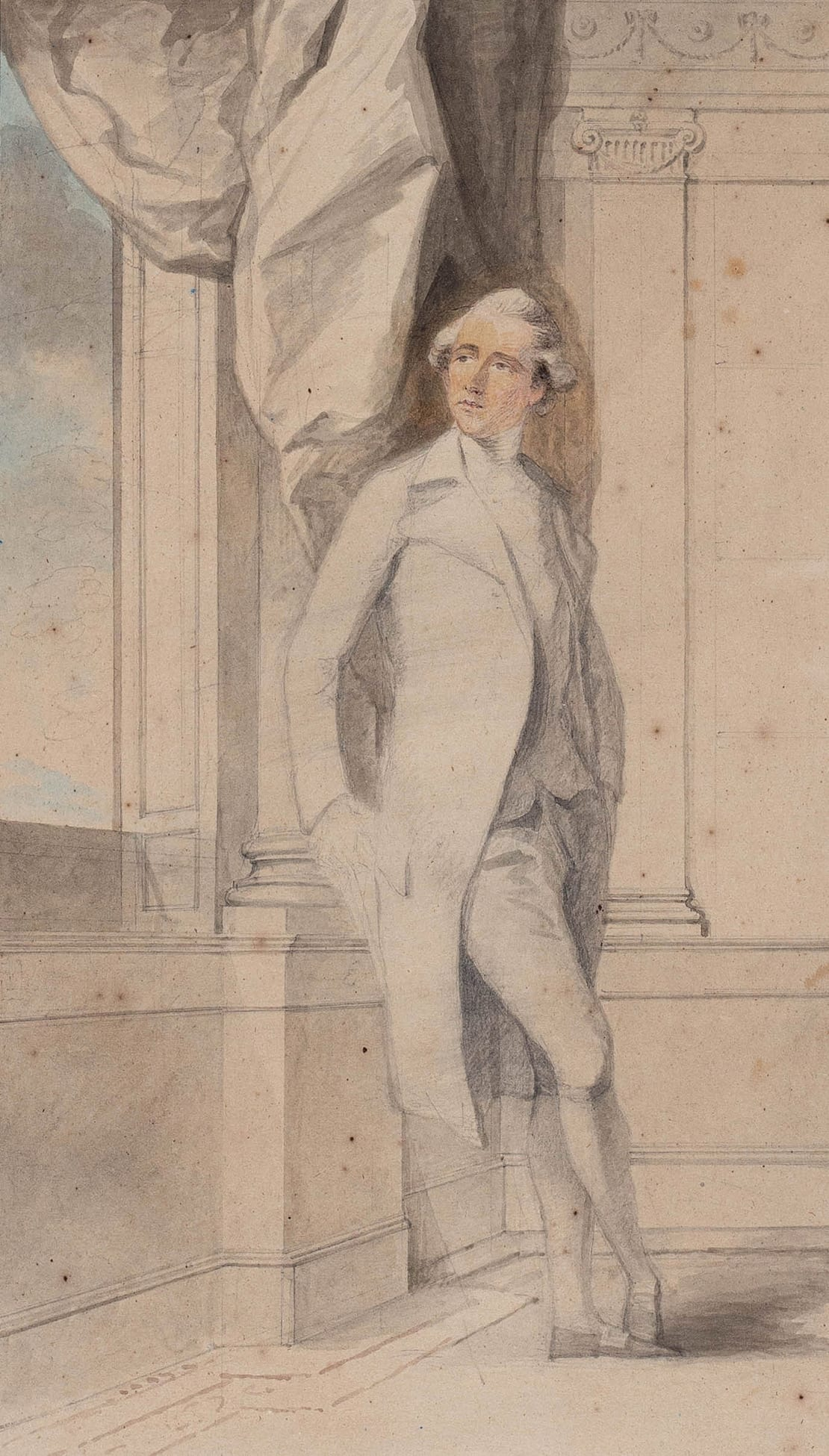

President of the Board of Trade
- In office 7 June 1804 – 5 February 1806
- Monarch: George III
- Prime Minister: William Pitt the Younger
- Preceded by: The Earl of Liverpool
- Succeeded by: The Lord Auckland

Personal details
- Born: 8 September 1755
- Died: 30 December 1836 (aged 81)
- Spouses: Lady Jemima Ashburnham (m. 1785; died 1786); Lady Caroline Montagu (m. 1790)
- Children: 6, including Georgiana, Lucy, and James
- Parents: William Graham, 2nd Duke of Montrose; Lady Lucy Manners

James Graham, 3rd Duke of Montrose, KG, KT, PC (8 September 1755 – 30 December 1836), styled Marquess of Graham until 1790, was a Scottish nobleman and statesman.

== Background ==
Montrose was the son of William Graham, 2nd Duke of Montrose, and Lady Lucy Manners, daughter of John Manners, 2nd Duke of Rutland.

== Political career ==
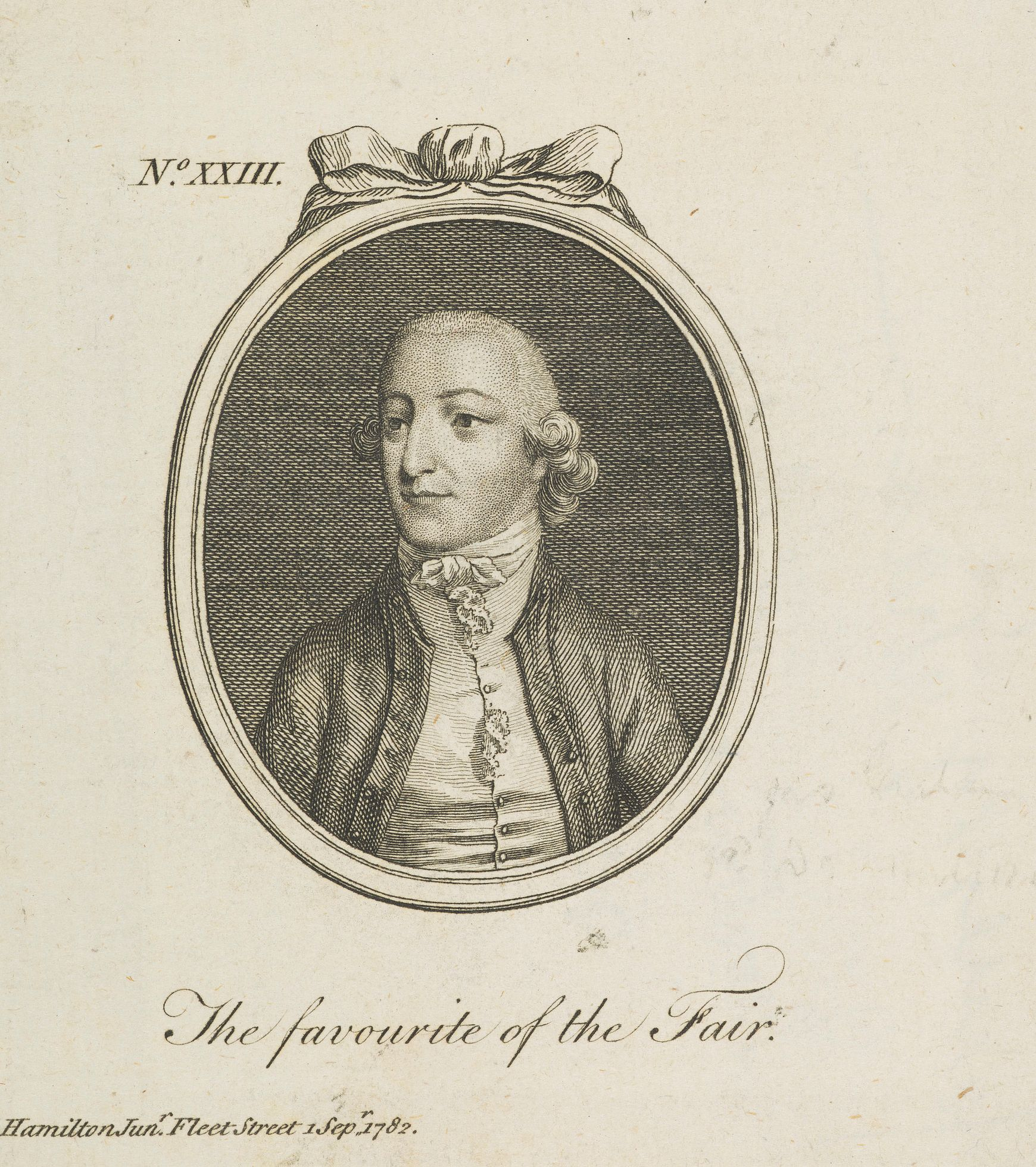
James Graham, 3rd Duke of Montrose

Montrose was Member of Parliament for Richmond from 1780, and for Great Bedwyn from 1784 to 1790, when he succeeded his father in the dukedom. According to Robert Bain, Scotland can thank him for the repeal in 1782 of the Dress Act 1746 prohibiting the wearing of tartans. He served as a Lord of the Treasury from 1783 to 1789, and as co-Paymaster of the Forces from 1789 to 1791. He was appointed a Privy Counsellor and Vice-President of the Board of Trade in 1789. He was Master of the Horse from 1790 to 1795, and from 1807 to 1821, Commissioner for India from 1791 to 1803, Lord Justice General of Scotland from 1795 to 1836, President of the Board of Trade from 1804 to 1806, Lord Chamberlain from 1821 to 1827 and from 1828 to 1830.

He was appointed Colonel of the Fifeshire Militia when that regiment was first raised in 1798, and given the rank of Brevet Colonel in the army while the regiment was embodied. He was replaced by a professional military officer when the regiment was reorganised in 1802.

He was appointed a Knight of the Thistle in 1793, resigning from the Order when appointed a Knight of the Garter in 1812. He was Chancellor of the University of Glasgow from 1780 to 1836, Lord Lieutenant of Huntingdonshire from 1790 to 1793, Lord Lieutenant of Stirlingshire from 1795 until his death, and Lord Lieutenant of Dumbartonshire from 1813 until his death.

Graham was a very effective member of the House of Commons, especially when speaking on Scottish topics. Early in his career as a minister under William Pitt the Younger, Graham was attacked in the Rolliad:

——Superior to abuse,
He nobly glories in the name of GOOSE;
Such Geese at Rome from the perfidious Gaul
Preserv'd the Treas'ry-Bench and Capitol, &c. &c

== Family ==
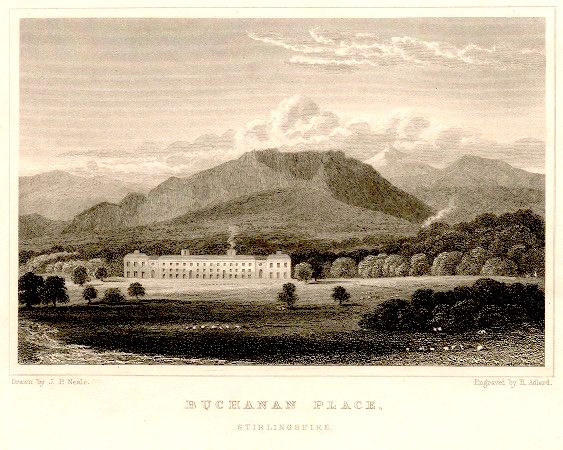
Buchanan Place, ancestral seat of Dukes of Montrose, burn down in 1850s, rebuilt as Buchanan Castle by William Burn.

Montrose was twice married. He married firstly Lady Jemima Ashburnham, daughter of John Ashburnham, 2nd Earl of Ashburnham, in 1785. His first wife died in September 1786, aged 24 (following the death of their only son born on 4 September 1786, who died as an infant in April 1787).

After her death, he married secondly Lady Caroline Montagu, daughter of George Montagu, 4th Duke of Manchester and Elizabeth Montagu, Duchess of Manchester, on 24 July 1790. They had seven children:

1. Lady Georgiana-Charlotte, born 1791. Married George Finch-Hatton, 10th Earl of Winchilsea.
2. Lady Caroline, born September 1792.
3. Lady Lucy, born October 1793. Married Edward Herbert, Viscount Clive (Later 2nd Earl of Powis). Grandson of Clive of India.
4. James Graham, 4th Duke of Montrose, born 16 July 1799.
5. Lady Martha, died in infancy.
6. Lady Emily, born in 1805. Married Edward Thomas Foley, grandson of Lord Foley.
7. Montagu-William, born February 1807.

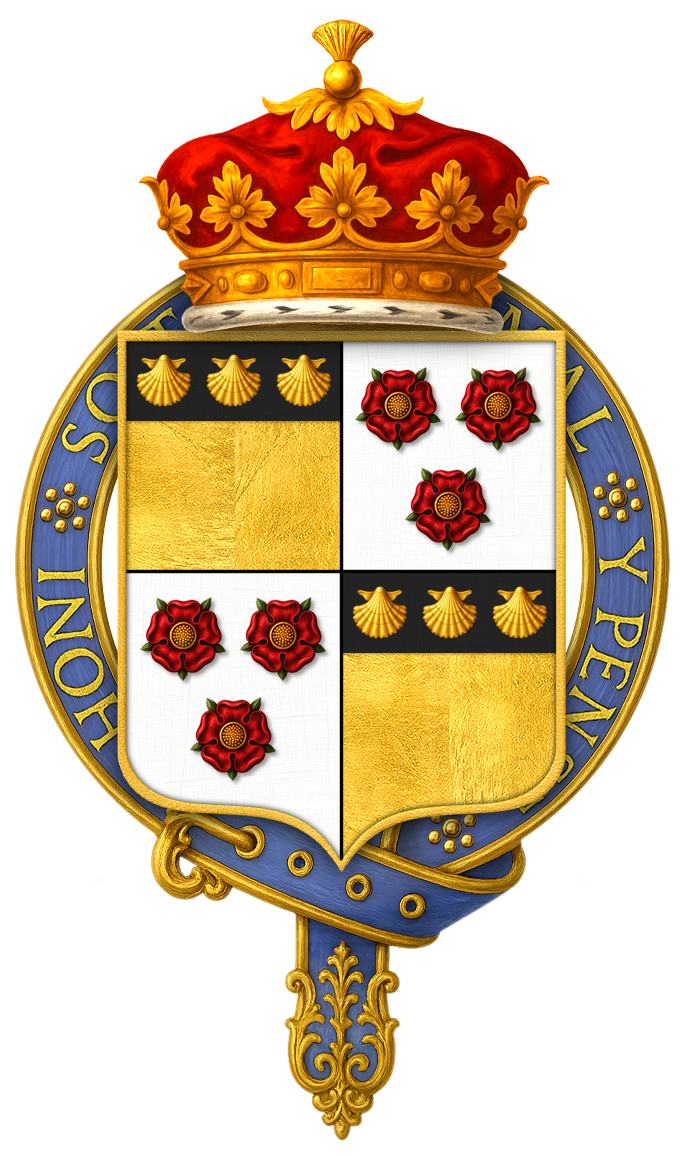
Shield of arms of James Graham, 3rd Duke of Montrose, KG, KT, PC

Montrose died at Grosvenor Square in December 1836, aged 81, and was succeeded in the dukedom by his son, James. The Duchess of Montrose died in March 1847, aged 76.

Parliament of Great Britain
Preceded by Charles Dundas; William Norton	Member of Parliament for Richmond; 1780–1784; With: Sir Lawrence Dundas 1780–1781; George FitzWilliam 1781–1784	Succeeded by Murrough O'Brien; Charles Dundas
Preceded by Sir Merrick Burrell; Paul Methuen	Member of Parliament for Great Bedwyn; 1784–1790; With: Robert Manners 1784–1790; Lord Doune 1790–1792	Succeeded by Lord Doune; Viscount Stopford
Political offices
Preceded by William Grenville	Vice-President of the Board of Trade; 1789–1790	Succeeded by Dudley Ryder
Preceded by William Grenville	Co-Paymaster of the Forces; 1789–1791	Succeeded by Dudley Ryder
Preceded by The Duke of Montagu	Master of the Horse; 1790–1795	Succeeded by The Earl of Westmorland
Preceded by The Earl of Liverpool	President of the Board of Trade; 1804–1806	Succeeded by The Earl Bathurst
Preceded by The Earl of Carnarvon	Master of the Horse; 1807–1821	Succeeded by The Duke of Dorset
Preceded by The Marquess of Hertford	Lord Chamberlain; 1821–1827	Succeeded by The Duke of Devonshire
Preceded by The Duke of Devonshire	Lord Chamberlain; 1828–1830	Succeeded by The Earl of Jersey
Legal offices
Preceded by The Earl of Mansfield	Lord Justice General; 1795–1836	Succeeded by Lord Granton
Academic offices
Preceded by The 2nd Duke of Montrose	Chancellor of the University of Glasgow; 1781–1836	Succeeded by The 4th Duke of Montrose
Honorary titles
Preceded by The Duke of Montagu	Lord Lieutenant of Huntingdonshire; 1790–1793	Succeeded by The Duke of Manchester
New office	Lord Lieutenant of Stirlingshire; 1794–1836	Succeeded by The Lord Abercromby
Preceded by The Lord Elphinstone	Lord Lieutenant of Dunbartonshire; 1813–1836	Succeeded by Sir James Colquhoun, Bt
Peerage of Scotland
Preceded by William Graham	Duke of Montrose; 1790–1836	Succeeded by James Graham
