= William Graham, 2nd Duke of Montrose =

British nobleman (1712-1790)

His Grace The Duke of Montrose
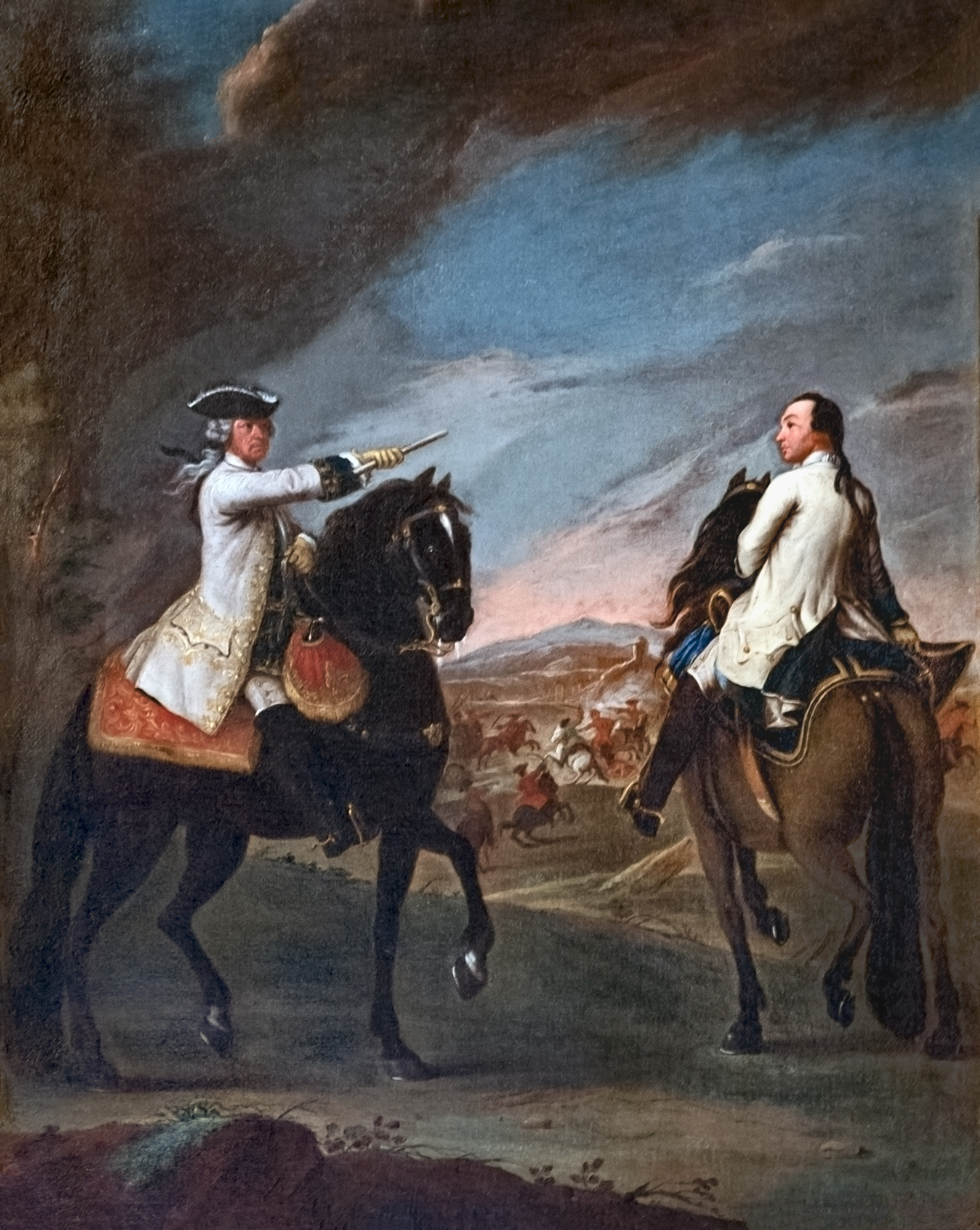
- Portrait of Montrose and his aide John Moser de Filsek, 1755.

Personal details
- Born: 27 August 1712
- Died: 23 September 1790 (aged 78)
- Spouse: Lady Lucy Manners (m. 1742)
- Children: Lady Lucy Graham; James Graham, 3rd Duke of Montrose
- Parent(s): James Graham, 1st Duke of Montrose; Lady Christian Carnegie

William Graham, 2nd Duke of Montrose (27 August 1712 – 23 September 1790) was a British nobleman. He his the son of James Graham, 1st Duke of Montrose and his wife, Lady Christian Carnegie, daughter of David Carnegie, 3rd Earl of Northesk.

== Biography ==
Educated at Eton College, he succeeded his father as Duke of Montrose in 1742.

He served as Chancellor of the University of Glasgow from 1743 to 1780.

== Marriage and issue ==
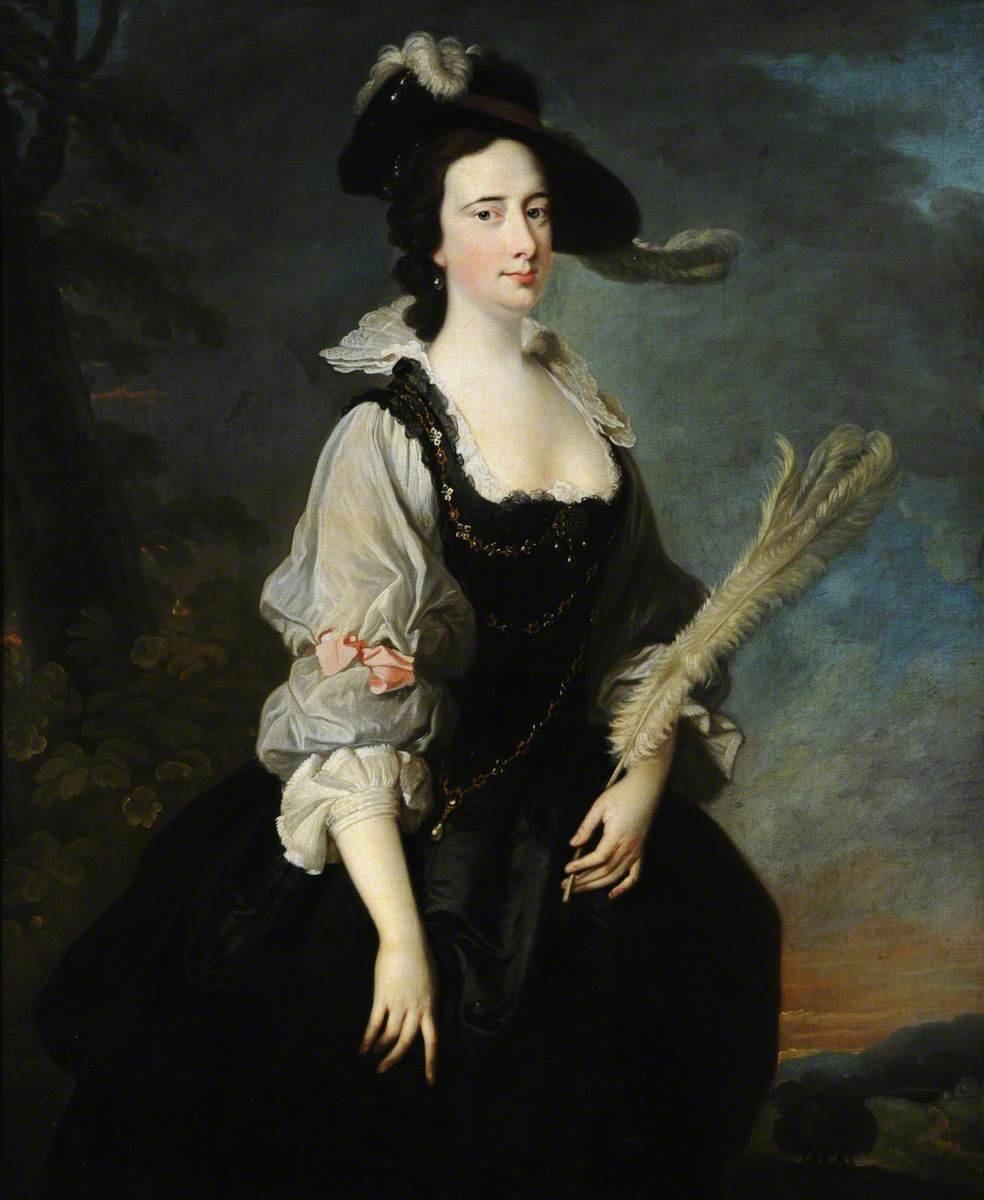
Lucy, Duchess of Montrose by Hudson

Montrose married Lady Lucy Manners, daughter of John Manners, 2nd Duke of Rutland and Hon. Lucy Sherard on 28 October 1742. They had two children:

- Lady Lucy Graham, who married Archibald Douglas, 1st Baron Douglas, had issue.
- James Graham, 3rd Duke of Montrose, who succeeded as duke.

He died at age 78 at Twickenham, Middlesex, England.

== Succession ==
Academic offices
Preceded by The 1st Duke of Montrose	Chancellor of the University of Glasgow; 1743–1780	Succeeded by The 3rd Duke of Montrose
Peerage of Scotland
Preceded by James Graham	Duke of Montrose; 1742–1790	Succeeded by James Graham
Peerage of Great Britain
Preceded by David Graham	Earl Graham; 1731–1790	Succeeded by James Graham
