= Lady Emily Foley =

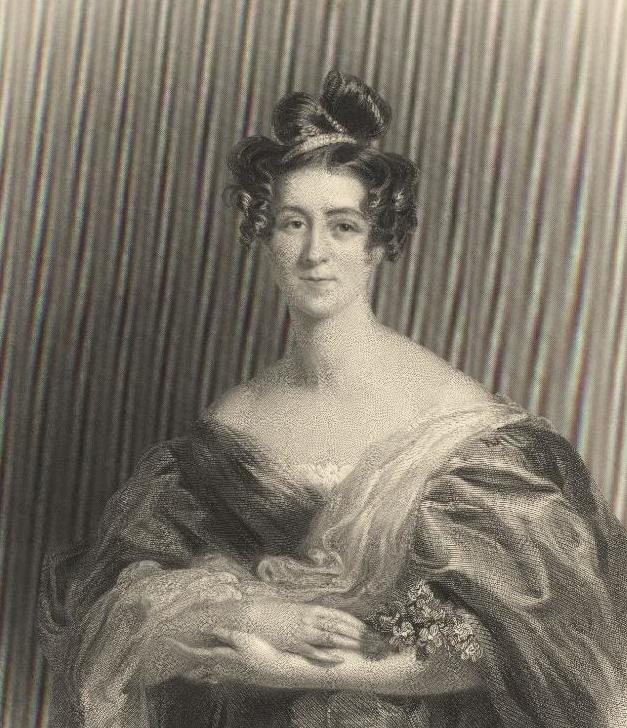
- Born: Emily Graham; 23 June 1805
- Died: 1 January 1900 (aged 94); Stoke Edith
- Spouse: Edward Thomas Foley
- Parent(s): James Graham, 3rd Duke of Montrose; Lady Caroline Montagu

Lady Emily Foley (23 June 1805 – 1 January 1900) was a major landowner and benefactress in nineteenth-century England.

She was born Lady Emily Graham, the daughter of James Graham, 3rd Duke of Montrose and Duchess of Montrose in 1805.

In 1832, she married The Hon. Edward Foley, who was fourteen years her senior. On his death in 1846, she gained control of extensive estates in Herefordshire, Worcestershire, and Staffordshire. She also became Lady of the Manor of Wednesbury and of Great Malvern. The inherited estate in 1883 generated close to £15,000 a year.

She presided over the rapid growth of Great Malvern during the middle of the nineteenth century. She placed many restrictions on building in the town, ensuring that all houses were well spaced, had large gardens, and maintained many trees. Her family name of Graham provided the name of Graham Road in the centre of the town, with its many large Victorian houses, including the Montrose Hotel. She was also a substantial benefactress of many churches and schools in Great Malvern.

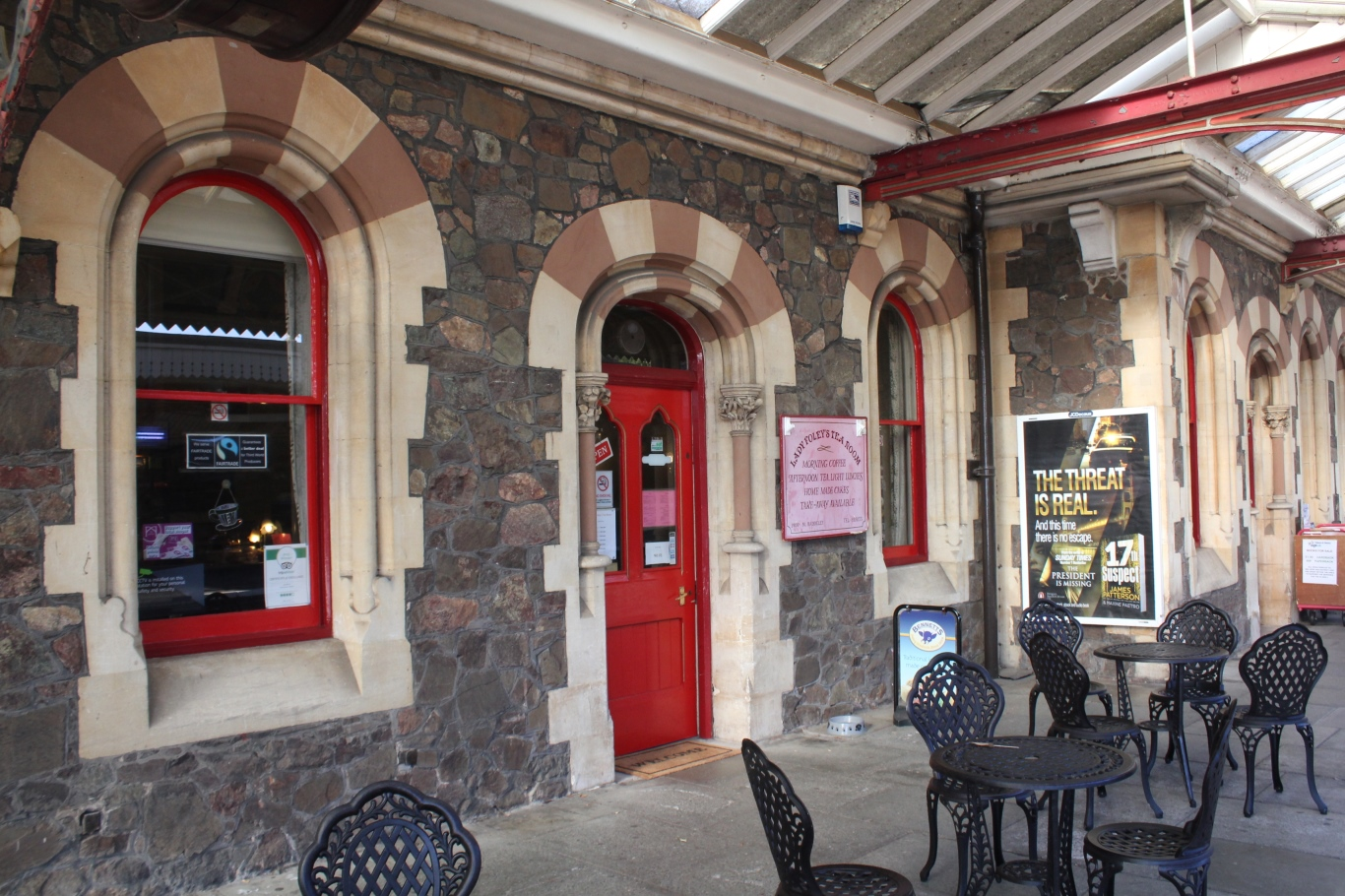
Lady Foley's Tea Rooms at Great Malvern railway station. They used to be the private waiting room of Lady Emily Foley who owned the land that the station was built on.

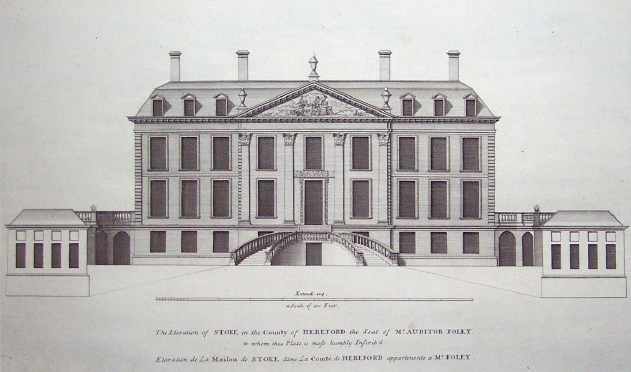
Stoke Edith House

When a railway line was to be built from Malvern to Hereford across land she owned, she insisted that cuttings be excavated so that the unsightly trains could not be seen. She had a waiting room built for her own use at Malvern station, so that whilst waiting for the ongoing train to London she did not have to wait with the common people, This room became known as Lady Foley's Tea Room.

She left no children and her husband's will made Lady Emily free to dispose the Stoke Edith estate in Herefordshire and extensive lands to whomever she chose but instead she allowed it to pass to her husband's great-nephew Paul Henry Foley of Prestwood, Staffordshire.

== Arms ==
Coat of arms of Lady Emily Foley
Escutcheon Edward Foley, grandson of Thomas Foley, 1st Baron Foley (Argent a fess engrailed between three cinquefoils Sable all within a bordure Sable) impaling James Graham, 3rd Duke of Montrose (Quarterly 1st & 4th Or on a chief Sable three escallops Or 2nd & 3rd Argent three roses Gules barbed and seeded Proper).
