= Elizabeth Montagu, Duchess of Manchester =

English noble (c. 1740 – 1832)

Her Grace The Duchess of Manchester
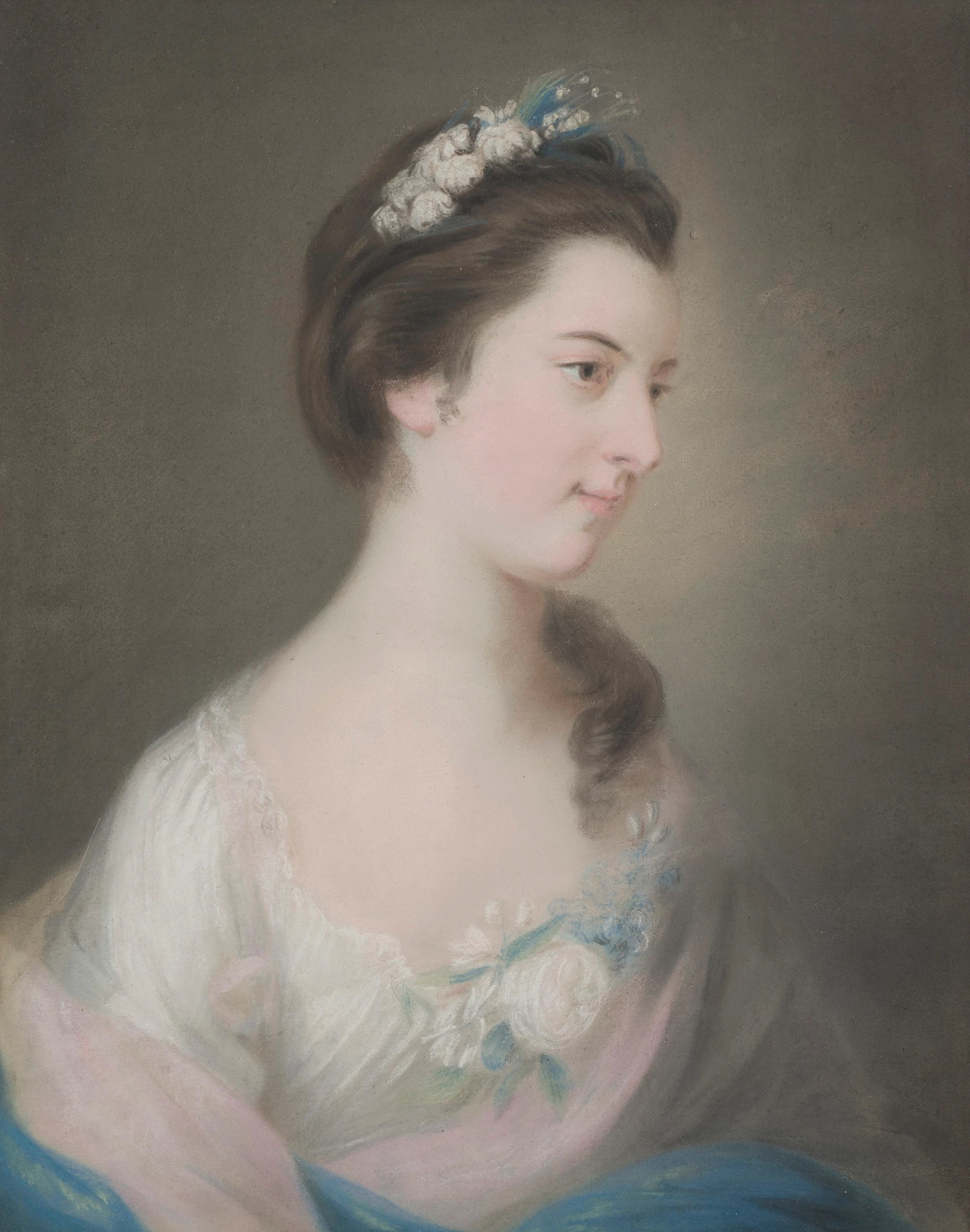
- Born: Elizabeth Dashwood; 1740; Kirtlington Park
- Died: 26 June 1832 (aged 91–92); Berkeley Square, London
- Spouse: George Montagu, 4th Duke of Manchester (m. 1762)
- Parent(s): Sir James Dashwood, 2nd Baronet; Elizabeth Spencer

Elizabeth Montagu, Duchess of Manchester (née Dashwood; c. 1740 – 26 June 1832) was the wife of George Montagu, 4th Duke of Manchester. Dowager Duchess of Manchester from 1788 to 1832.

She was born at Kirtlington Park in Oxfordshire, a daughter of Sir James Dashwood, 2nd Baronet, and his wife, the former Elizabeth Spencer (whose sister Anne was Duchess of Hamilton). One of Elizabeth Dashwood's sisters, Anne Dashwood, became Countess of Galloway.

She married the Duke of Manchester on 22 or 23 October 1762, at St George's, Hanover Square, London, in the same year he inherited the dukedom. Their children were:

- Lady Ana Maria Montagu, who died in childhood
- George Montagu, Viscount Mandeville (1763–1772), who died in childhood and did not inherit his father's title
- Lady Caroline Maria Montagu (1770–1847), who married James Graham, 3rd Duke of Montrose, and had children
- William Montagu, 5th Duke of Manchester (1771–1843)
- Lord Frederick Montagu, MP (1774–1827)
- Lady Emily Montagu (died 1838)

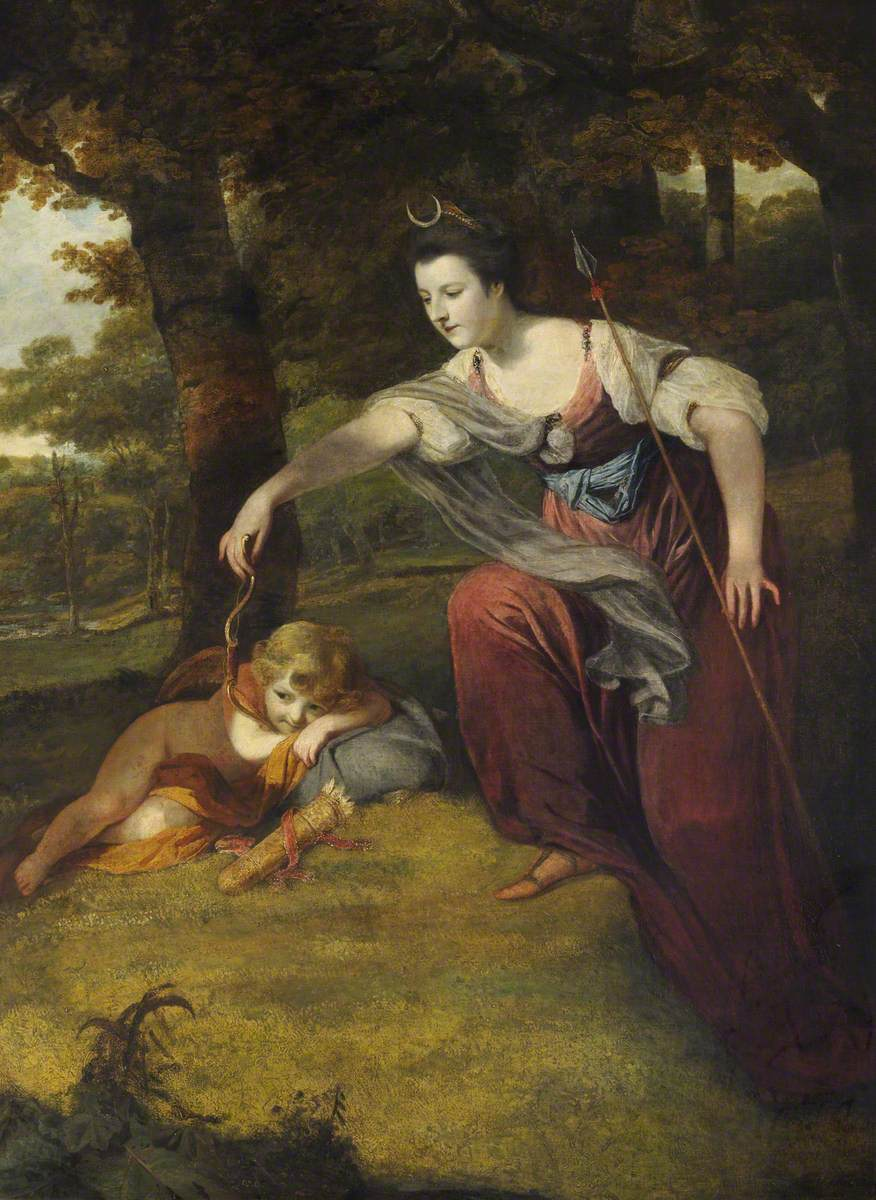
Diana Disarming Cupid, Elizabeth Dashwood and Her Son George Montagu, Viscount Manderville. by Joshua Reynolds

Sir Joshua Reynolds painted the duchess, along with her son George, Viscount Mandeville, in about 1766. The duchess was herself an amateur artist, whose pocket book is held by the Royal Academy of Arts in London.

The Duchess of Manchester at one time snobbishly refused to speak to the French actor Monsieur Tessier because he earned his living, the Duchess of Devonshire was dismayed at the duchess's snobbery and pointedly danced with him at Almack's ball.

The duke died in 1788, following which his widow received an annual pension of £3000, as official compensation for the loss of his income as Collector of Customs.

The dowager duchess died at her home in Berkeley Square, London, in 1832, in her 92nd year, and was buried at Kimbolton.
