= George Montagu, 4th Duke of Manchester =

British politician and diplomat (1737-1788)

His Grace The Duke of Manchester PC
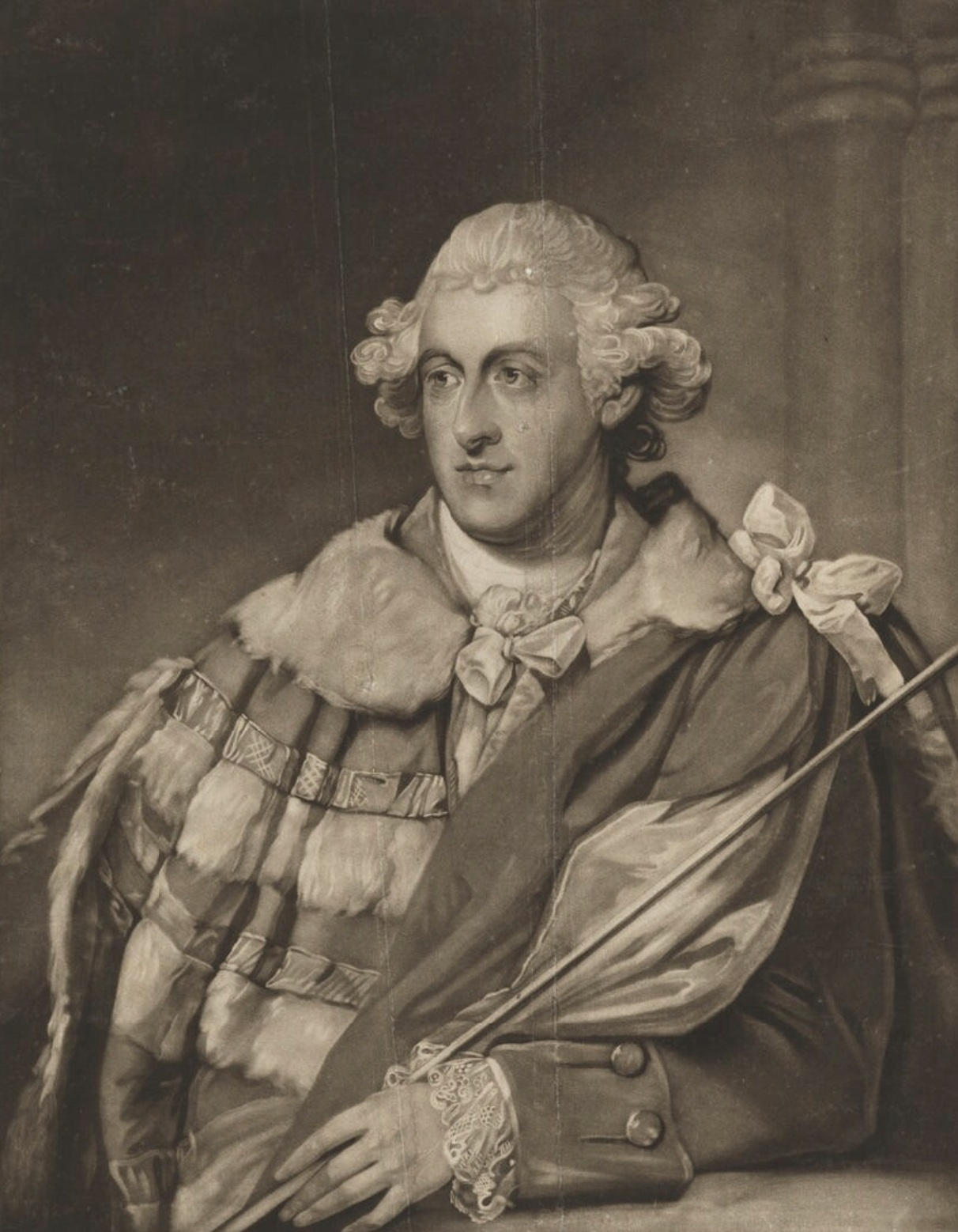
- Engraving by John Jones after a Gilbert Stuart portrait, 1790

British Ambassador to France
- In office 1783–1784
- Preceded by: Alleyne FitzHerbert
- Succeeded by: The Duke of Dorset

Member of Parliament for Huntingdonshire
- In office 1761–1762 Serving with The Lord Carysfort
- Preceded by: Coulson Fellowes; The Lord Carysfort
- Succeeded by: The Lord Carysfort; Lord Charles Montagu

Personal details
- Born: George Montagu; 6 April 1737
- Died: 2 September 1788 (aged 51)
- Party: Whig
- Spouse: Elizabeth Dashwood (m. 1762)
- Children: 6, including Caroline, William, Frederick
- Parent: Robert Montagu, 3rd Duke of Manchester

George Montagu, 4th Duke of Manchester PC (6 April 1737 – 2 September 1788) was a British politician and diplomat.

== Early life ==
He was the son of Robert Montagu, 3rd Duke of Manchester and the former Harriet Dunch. Among his siblings were Lord Charles Montagu (who married Elizabeth Bulmer) and Lady Caroline Montagu (wife of Charles Herbert, grandson of Thomas Herbert, 8th Earl of Pembroke).

His paternal grandparents were Charles Montagu, 1st Duke of Manchester and the former Hon. Dodington Greville. Among his Montagu relatives were uncle William Montagu, 2nd Duke of Manchester (who married Lady Isabella Montagu eldest daughter of John Montagu, 2nd Duke of Montagu and Lady Mary Churchill) and aunt Lady Charlotte Montagu (who married Pattee Byng, 2nd Viscount Torrington). His mother, a daughter and co-heiress of Edmund Dunch and Elizabeth Godfrey (the noted beauty), was a sister-in-law of Hugh Boscawen, 1st Viscount Falmouth and niece of John Churchill, 1st Duke of Marlborough.

== Career ==
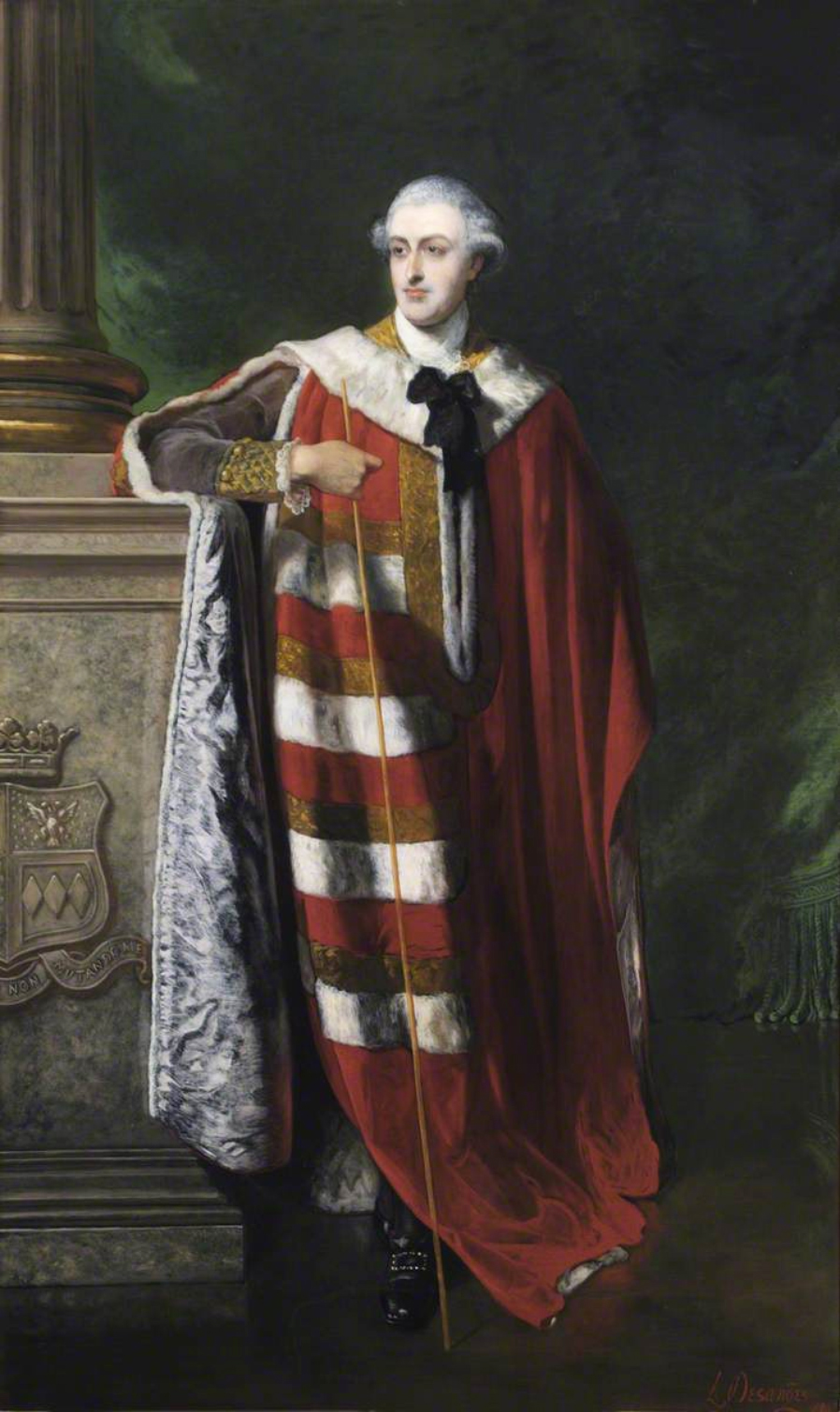
1884 portrait of Manchester by Louis William Desanges

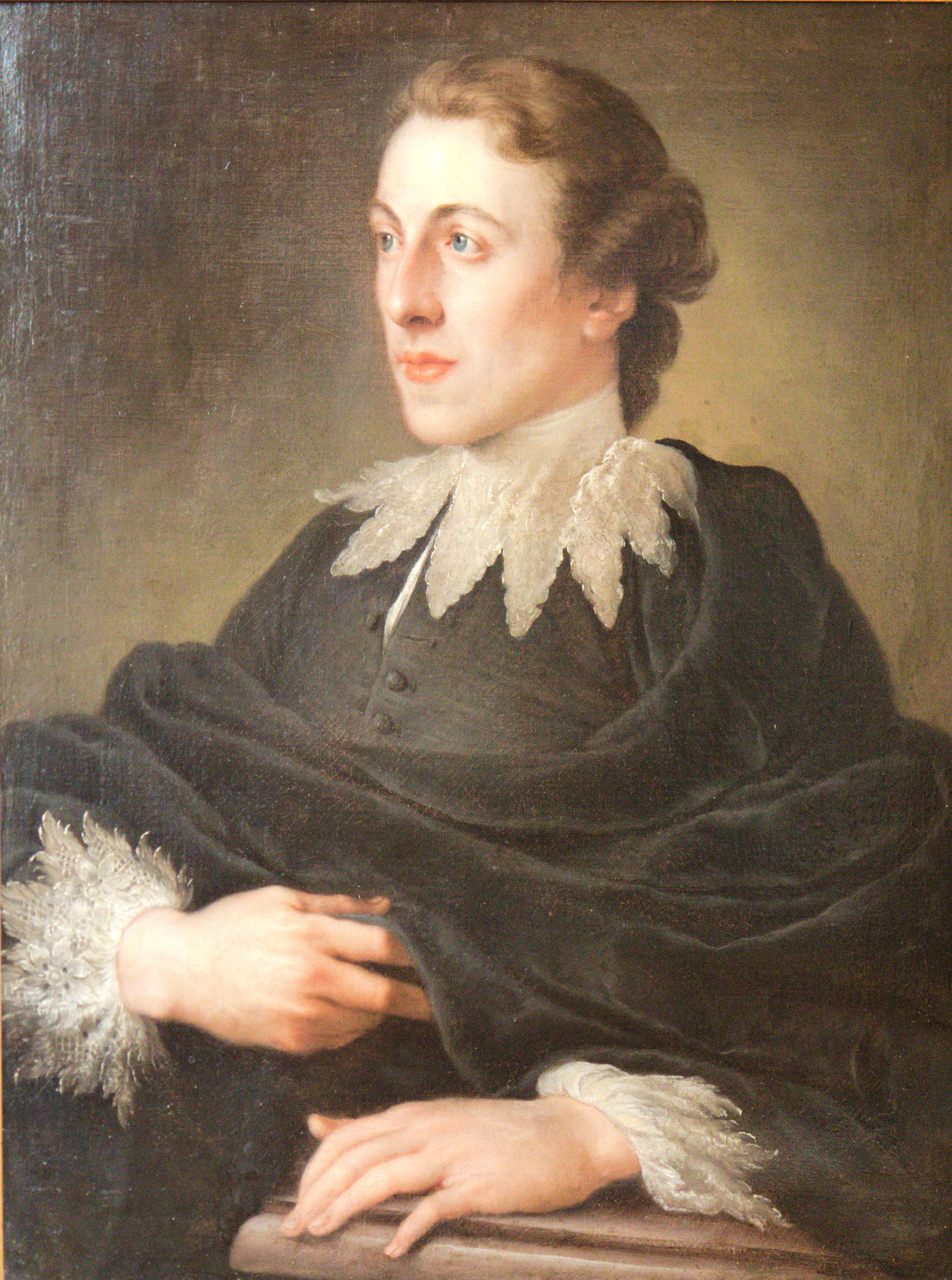
Portrait painted in Italy, 18th century

Like his father before him, Manchester was a Whig Member of Parliament for Huntingdonshire from 1761 to 1762, when he inherited his father's title. Upon acceding to the dukedom, he employed Robert Adam to make designs for Kimbolton Castle, his principal seat.

He took his seat in the House of Lords on 25 November, 1762. He served as Collector of Subsidies in the Port of London in 1762 and was Lord of the Bedchamber from 1762 to 1770, resigning his position after the fall of the Grafton ministry in January and went into opposition.

Beginning in 1782, he succeeded the Earl of Hertford as Lord Chamberlain of the Household, serving until 1783 Lord Hertford resumed his duties.

He was a supporter of Lord Rockingham, and an active opponent in the House of Lords of Lord North's American policy. In the Rockingham ministry of 1782 Manchester became Lord Chamberlain, Also in 1782, he was appointed a Privy Councillor. In 1783, he was appointed Ambassador to France to "supervise the conclusion of treaty negotiations between Great Britain and France, Spain, and the Netherlands." Manchester signed the Peace of Paris at Versailles for Great Britain to end the American Revolutionary War.

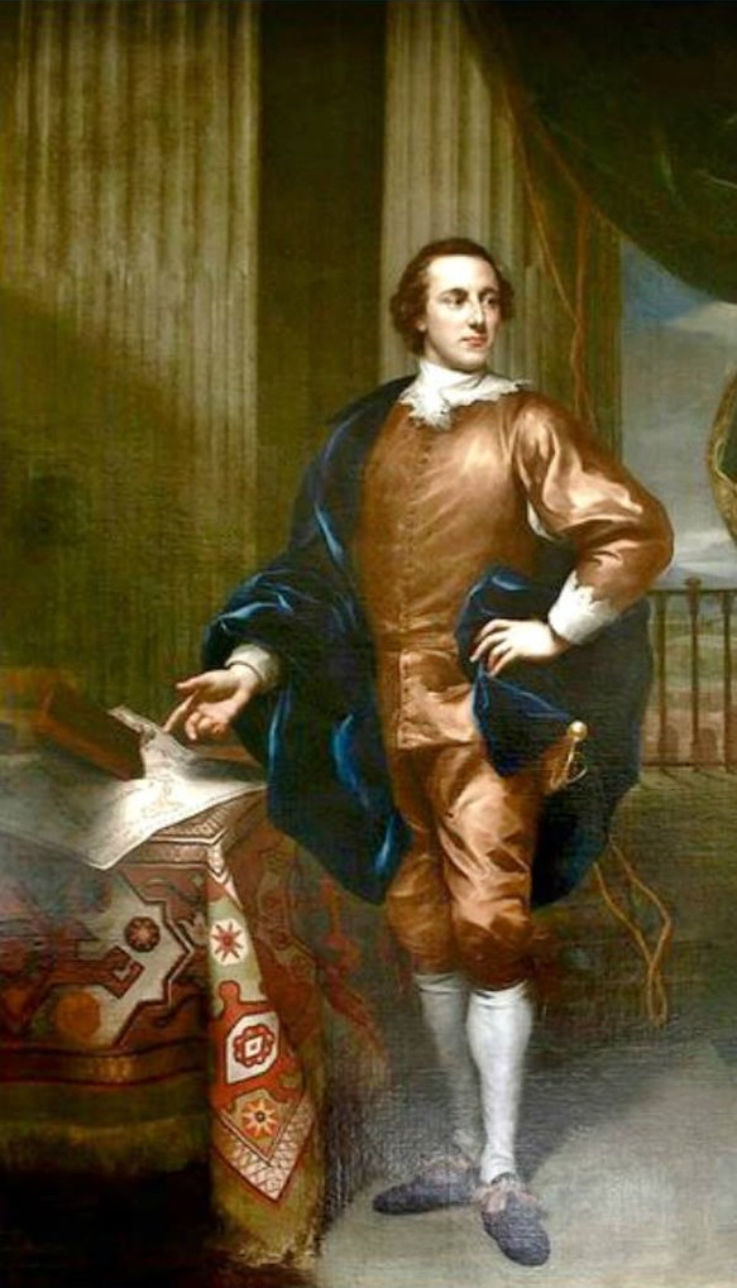
Portrait of Manchester by Anton Raphael Mengs

Manchester was Lord Lieutenant of Huntingdonshire from 1762 until his death in 1788. He was also Grand Master of the Freemasons from 1777 to 1782 when he was succeeded by Prince Henry, Duke of Cumberland and Strathearn.

== Personal life ==
On 22 October 1762, Manchester was married to Elizabeth Dashwood (c. 1740–1832). She was a daughter of Sir James Dashwood, 2nd Baronet of Kirtlington Park and the former Elizabeth Spencer (a daughter and co-heiress of Edward Spencer of Rendlesham). They had several children, including:

- George Montagu, Viscount Mandeville (1763–1772), who died in childhood.
- Lady Caroline Maria Montagu (1770–1847), married James Graham, 3rd Duke of Montrose.
- William Montagu, 5th Duke of Manchester (1771–1843), who married Lady Susan Gordon, the third daughter of Alexander Gordon, 4th Duke of Gordon. Lady Susan was the co-heiress of her brother, George Gordon, 5th Duke of Gordon.
- Lord Frederick Montagu (1774–1827), who died unmarried.
- Lady Anna Maria Montagu (d. 1796), who died unmarried.
- Lady Emily Montagu, (d. 1838), who served as Housekeeper of Hampton Court Palace.

Manchester was notoriously short of funds, and in 1767 it was necessary for him to sell the Manchester family London house in Berkeley Square to the banker and politician Robert Child.

The Duke of Manchester died, after a brief illness, on 2 September 1788. The Dowager Duchess of Manchester died on 26 June 1832.

Parliament of Great Britain
Preceded by Coulson Fellowes; The Lord Carysfort	Member of Parliament for Huntingdonshire; 1761–1762; With: The Lord Carysfort	Succeeded by The Lord Carysfort; Lord Charles Montagu
Political offices
Preceded by The Earl of Hertford	Lord Chamberlain; 1782–1783	Succeeded by The Earl of Hertford
Diplomatic posts
Preceded by Alleyne FitzHerbert	Ambassador to France; 1783–1784	Succeeded by The Duke of Dorset
Honorary titles
Preceded by The Duke of Manchester	Lord Lieutenant of Huntingdonshire; 1762–1788	Succeeded by The Duke of Montagu
Masonic offices
Preceded by The Lord Petre	Grand Master of the Premier Grand Lodge of England; 1777–1782	Succeeded by Prince Henry, Duke of Cumberland and Strathearn
Peerage of Great Britain
Preceded by Robert Montagu	Duke of Manchester; 1762–1788	Succeeded by William Montagu
