= Chancellor (surname) =

Chancellor is a surname. Notable people with the surname include:

- Alexander Chancellor (1940–2017), British journalist, son of Christopher Chancellor
- Alice Chancellor (1912–1985), American engineer
- Anna Chancellor (born 1965), British actress, granddaughter of Christopher Chancellor
- Cecilia Chancellor (born 1966), British model, daughter of Alexander Chancellor
- Christopher Chancellor (1904–1989), British journalist, son of John Chancellor (1870–1952)
- Edward Chancellor (born 1962), English financial historian and investment strategist, grandson of Christopher Chancellor
- Jhon Chancellor (born 1992), Venezuelan football player
- John Chancellor (1927–1996), American journalist
- John Chancellor (British administrator) (1870–1952), father of Christopher Chancellor
- Justin Chancellor (born 1971), bassist for Tool
- Kam Chancellor (born 1988), American football player
- Richard Chancellor (died 1556), English explorer and navigator

Fictional characters:

- Katherine Chancellor, character on The Young and the Restless
- Olive Chancellor, character in The Bostonians

== See also ==
- Cansler
