= Sleaford Navigation =

Canal in Lincolnshire, England

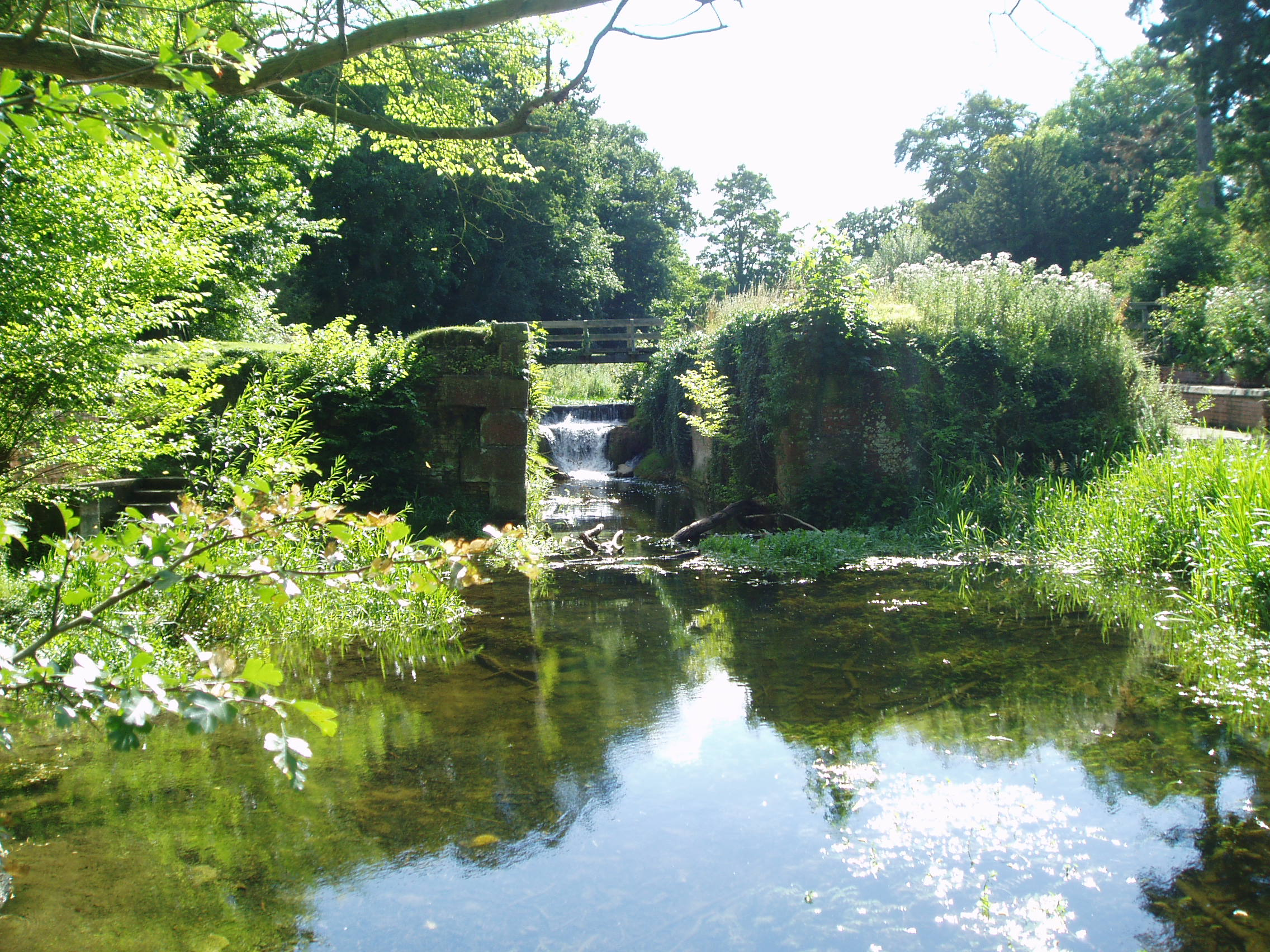
- The derelict chamber at Haverholme Lock awaiting restoration

Specifications
- Maximum boat length: 70 ft 0 in (21.34 m)
- Maximum boat beam: 15 ft 0 in (4.57 m)
- Locks: 7 (2 operational)
- Status: Part operational
- Navigation authority: none

History
- Original owner: Sleaford Navigation Co
- Principal engineer: William Crawley
- Date of act: 1792
- Date of first use: 1794

Geography
- Start point: Sleaford
- End point: Chapel Hill
- Connects to: River Witham

The Sleaford Navigation was a 12.5-mile (20.1 km) canalisation of the River Slea in Lincolnshire, England, which opened in 1794. It ran from a junction with the River Witham, near Chapel Hill to the town of Sleaford through seven locks, most of which were adjacent to mills. Lack of finance meant that it stopped short of its intended terminus, but it gradually grew to be successful financially. The coming of the railways in 1857 led to a rapid decline, and it was officially abandoned by an act of Parliament in 1878, but remained open for a further three years. The lower part of it remained navigable until the 1940s, when it was blocked by a sluice.

Interest in restoring the canal began in 1972, and navigation was restored to the first 8 miles (13 km) with the re-opening of Lower Kyme lock in 1986. The Sleaford Navigation Trust has been working towards restoring the whole waterway, and succeeded in purchasing the Sleaford end of the river bed in 2004. A short section at Sleaford was opened in 2010, following the installation of a lift bridge.

Nearby, Navigation House, which served as the clerk's office, has been restored as a visitor centre about the canal, and the adjacent seed warehouse has been turned into The National Centre for Craft & Design.

== History ==
The River Slea rises to the west of Sleaford, near Ancaster, and flows in an easterly direction, passing through Sleaford on its way to South Kyme, beyond which it is called the Kyme Eau, joining the River Witham at Chapel Hill. Kyme Eau had been navigable since at least the reign of Edward III, for in 1375 Gilbert d'Umframville was accused of illegally collecting tolls on boats carrying food products to the people of Kesteven. He had been doing so for 12 years, and he defended his case before the king, explaining that the river was navigable from Dog Dyke to Brent Fen, but that it suffered from silting and the banks were in a poor state of repair. Having agreed to carry out repairs, he was granted the right to levy tolls by letters patent.

With influential local landowners such as Sir Jenison Gordon of Haverholme Priory and Sir Christopher Whitchcote of Aswarby wanting to improve communications to the area, a proposal to link Sleaford by canal to Grantham was considered in 1774, but was replaced by a scheme to provide a navigable link along the Slea and the Kyme Eau to the Witham in 1783. Following a public meeting in Sleaford on 16 January, a committee was formed to promote the scheme, and in order for it to be profitable, negotiations began with the Commissioners of the River Witham, to reduce the tolls on that river for traffic to and from the Slea. Although initially rebuffed, the committee persisted, and the Commissioners eventually agreed to terms.

At the time, the River Slea was not navigable beyond Kyme, as the channel was inadequate, and there were fish weirs and water mills on its course. Three attempts were made to obtain an act of Parliament to authorise improvements, but all were defeated. In 1791, William Jessop and John Hudson were commissioned to prepare a new survey and plans. Jessop was a canal engineer of some repute, with experience of several navigations, including the River Trent at Newark, while Hudson was less well known, but had experience of canal building in eastern England and Yorkshire. Their report was published on 25 November 1791, and estimated that the improvements would cost £9,979. The plans obtained the support of Sir Joseph Banks, a baronet who was a patron of the natural sciences, and had been the President of the Royal Society since 1778. The fourth attempt to obtain an act of Parliament was successful, probably due to his influence.

Sleaford Navigation Act 1792
- Act of Parliament
- Parliament of Great Britain
- Long title: An Act for making and maintaining a Navigation from Sleaford Castle Causeway, through the Town of Sleaford, in the County of Lincoln, along the Course of Sleaford Mill Stream and Kyme Eau, to the River Witham, at or near Chappel Hill, in the same County; and for making necessary Cuts for better effecting the said Navigation.
- Citation: 32 Geo. 3. c. 106
- Territorial extent: Great Britain

Dates
- Royal assent: 11 June 1792
- Commencement: 31 January 1792 (Note: Start of session.)

Status: Current legislation

Text of statute as originally enacted

The Sleaford Navigation Act 1792 (32 Geo. 3. c. 106) was passed on 11 June 1792, creating The Company of Proprietors of the Sleaford Navigation, which was empowered to make and maintain a Navigation from Sleaford Castle Causeway, through the town of Sleaford, along the course of Sleaford Mill Stream and Kyme Eau, to the River Witham, at or near Chappel Hill. It had authority to raise £13,000 in capital for the project, with an additional £6,500 if necessary. Most of the money was raised within Lincolnshire, with half of the shares being bought by people living in Sleaford. Six proprietors were elected to serve on a committee, which expressed its thanks to Joseph Banks at its first meeting. By the end of 1793, £16,000 had been raised to fund construction.

The Horncastle Canal was being constructed at the same time, and the two companies negotiated to find an engineer who would oversee both projects. They approached Henry Eastburn, but he did not accept, and so William Cawley from Mickle Trafford in Cheshire was appointed. Five locks were required to negotiate the mills, and there were additional locks at Lower Kyme and near Flax Dyke, in the parish of Ewerley. They were built as broad locks, 60 by 15 feet (18.3 by 4.6 m), and the total fall from Sleaford was 42 feet (13 m). Six contracts with a total value of £4,000, for the construction of locks and bridges, were awarded to John Dyson Sr., who worked with Peter Tyler and John Langwith. Defects were reported with the lock at Haverholme in 1794, and when the opening of the canal was announced, Dyson produced advertisements which stated that the canal would not open unless he was paid for the work he had carried out. The company responded that the only place to sort out such disagreements was in a law court, and the opening went ahead on 6 May 1794. The enabling act specified that the terminus would be at Castle Causeway, from where it would follow the southern mill stream to pass through the south bridge, and then along the Sleaford millstream through Old Sleaford and New Sleaford. Financial difficulties meant that it stopped short of its intended terminus, and instead the company built a wharf to the east of what is now Carre Street in Sleaford.

=== Operation ===
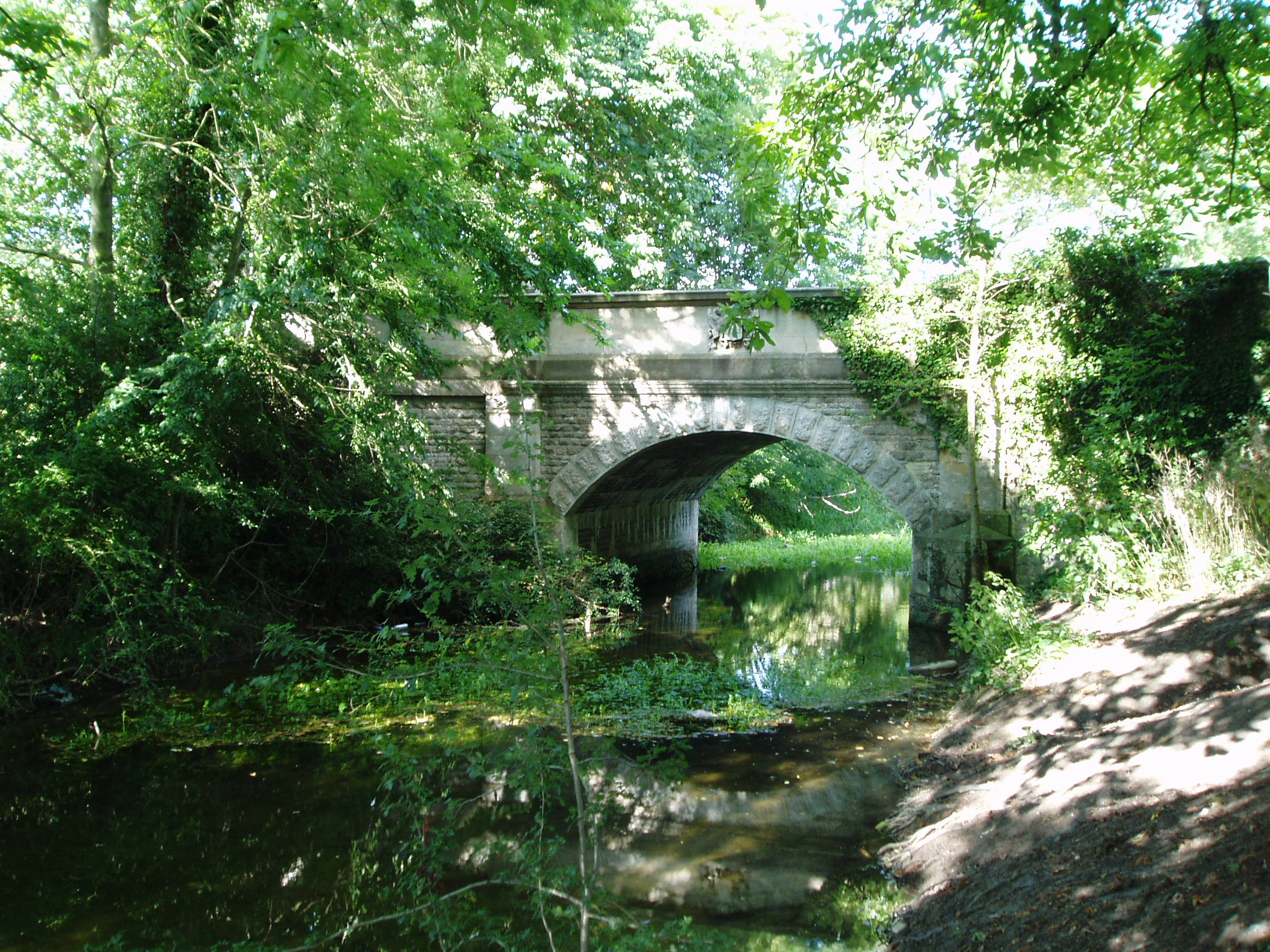
The road bridge just below Haverholme Lock

Trade on the navigation was adequate, but the company was hampered by the overrun in the cost of construction. Dividends were paid to shareholders in 1795, 1817, 1818 and 1824, but profits had improved by 1826, and regular dividends were then paid. Between 1836 and 1856, they ranged from five per cent to eight per cent. Rather than the proprietors collecting the tolls, they were let to toll collectors. In 1816, John Keyworth paid £1,010 for the privilege, while by 1839, Joshua Bower had to pay £1,590. This practice ceased in 1851, as receipts fell.

While the navigation prospered, there were plans to extend it. The first plan was for an extension to the west to Wilsford, suggested on 1827. Six years later J. Rofe and his son revived the idea, first proposed in 1774, for a 16-mile (26 km) link from Sleaford to Grantham. In the same year, a Sleaford trader attempted to get the navigation extended to its authorised terminus at Castle Causeway, but the company stated that at the time of construction, only £700 had been left for the final 500 yards (460 m) to the causeway, and as that would not have been enough, they had provided a suitable wharf at the present terminus. While none of these extensions were pursued, plans for the installation of a weighing machine on the wharf in 1837 escalated, and resulted in a residence for the clerk of the canal and a weighing office being built. A crane was installed in 1841, but success was soon threatened by the coming of the railways.

=== Decline ===
A railway from Grantham to Sleaford opened in 1857. This was extended to Boston in 1859, and so offered direct competition to the navigation. The decline was rapid. Income fell from £981 in 1858 to £168 in 1868, and the share price dropped from £40 to £10 between 1860 and 1863. The company was trading at a loss by 1871, and although an Act of Abandonment was obtained on 17 June 1878, the navigation did not actually close until 14 May 1881, which was also the date of the final meeting of the proprietors. The Act required the company to fill in the three locks nearest to Sleaford, but there were special provisions for the remaining structures. The next three were on a stretch of river bordered by land belonging to Haverholme Priory, and were to be put into good order and handed over to Murray Finch Hatton, earl of Winchilsea & Nottingham, who owned the Priory. He could then maintain or abandon them, but was required to construct sluices if he chose to abandon them. The final lock was to be handed over to the commissioners of the River Witham, once it was in good order, and they could remove the gates and fill in the lock if they chose to do so.

Although officially closed, both Finch Hatton and the Witham Commissioners chose to retain the locks, and the lower 6.5 miles (10.5 km) of the navigation from Ewerby Waithe Common to the River Witham remained navigable until the 1940s. Lower Kyme lock was then replaced by a sluice, which prevented navigation until a lock was reinstated in 1986.

== Restoration ==
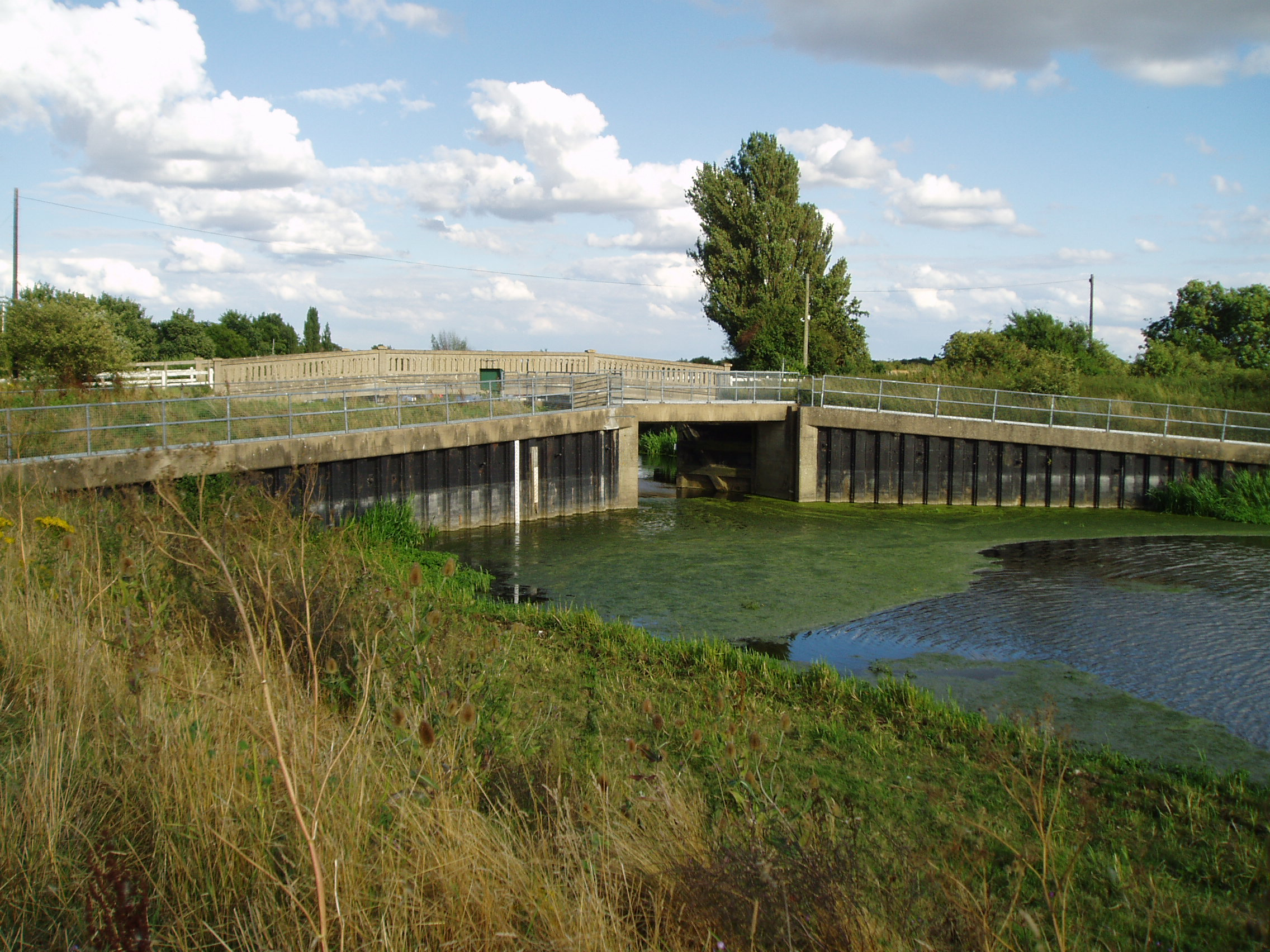
The flood gates at the entrance to the Navigation, designed to close as levels in the River Witham rise

In 1972, Ronald Russell produced the book Lost Canals of England and Wales, in which he had compiled details of 78 canals then considered to be derelict. This acted as a catalyst for several restoration schemes, including one for the Sleaford Navigation. This plan initially centred on the canal head in Sleaford, and promoted by the Sleaford Civic Society. On 4 November 1977, the Sleaford Navigation Society was formed, with the wider aim of restoring navigation to the whole canal, and publishing research into other Lincolnshire navigations. The society managed to gain the support of the Anglian Water Authority for their plans in 1980, which resulted in the restoration of the Kyme Eau lock, re-opened in November 1986. With the raising of a low footbridge and the construction of a winding hole at South Kyme,> the first 8 miles (13 km) of the waterway were returned to navigation. In 1991, work commenced on Cobblers lock, and was completed by 1994, although it has not been fitted with gates as the banks of the section above it need strengthening before the water levels can be raised.

Funded by a Derelict Land Grant, the engineering consultants Binnies carried out a feasibility study in 1994, which concluded that full restoration was possible. A new administrative structure for the project was created in 1997, when the Sleaford Navigation Trust was formed, and the Navigation Society was disbanded. The Trust has continued to work on restoring the structures of the canal, campaigning successfully to prevent the Navigation Warehouse from being demolished in 1998. The local council organised funding for the restoration of the warehouse and the former offices of the canal company in 2002, and Lincolnshire County Council funded a further study which looked at how to provide an adequate water supply for a re-opened canal. The former seed warehouse now forms part of The Hub, housing the National Centre for Craft and Design, which is supported by the Arts Council and is one of the leading centres for the promotion and exhibition of international craft and design in the UK.

In 2004, the Navigation Trust was able to buy the bed of the river between Carre Street in Sleaford and Bone Mill, which included the lock and its island at Cogglesford Mill. Lower Kyme lock was refurbished in the winter of 2008. The upper gate is a vertical guillotine gate, and the mechanism required 350 turns of a handle to raise the gate, and another 350 to lower it again. New lock gates were fitted, and a new geared mechanism requiring fewer turns made the lock easier to operate. Around 0.6 miles (0.97 km) of the waterway from Sleaford to Cogglesford Mill lock were reopened, following the construction of a lifting bridge in the town centre. This was installed in late December 2008, although the hydraulic operating gear was not fitted until January 2010. Work was also carried out to construct a new slipway on Eastgate Green, to allow trailed boats to be launched onto the town section. This involved careful planning to avoid damage to 27 mature trees, and the widening of 92 feet (28 m) of the bank to create a mooring point. Funding was provided by Lincolnshire County Council, the Inland Waterways Association, and Waste Recycling Environmental Ltd (WREN), which administers the Landfill Communities Fund. An official opening of the new bridge and facilities took place on 3 July 2010, when three boats were launched from the slipway. Members from canoe clubs at Boston and Sleaford attended.

== Course ==
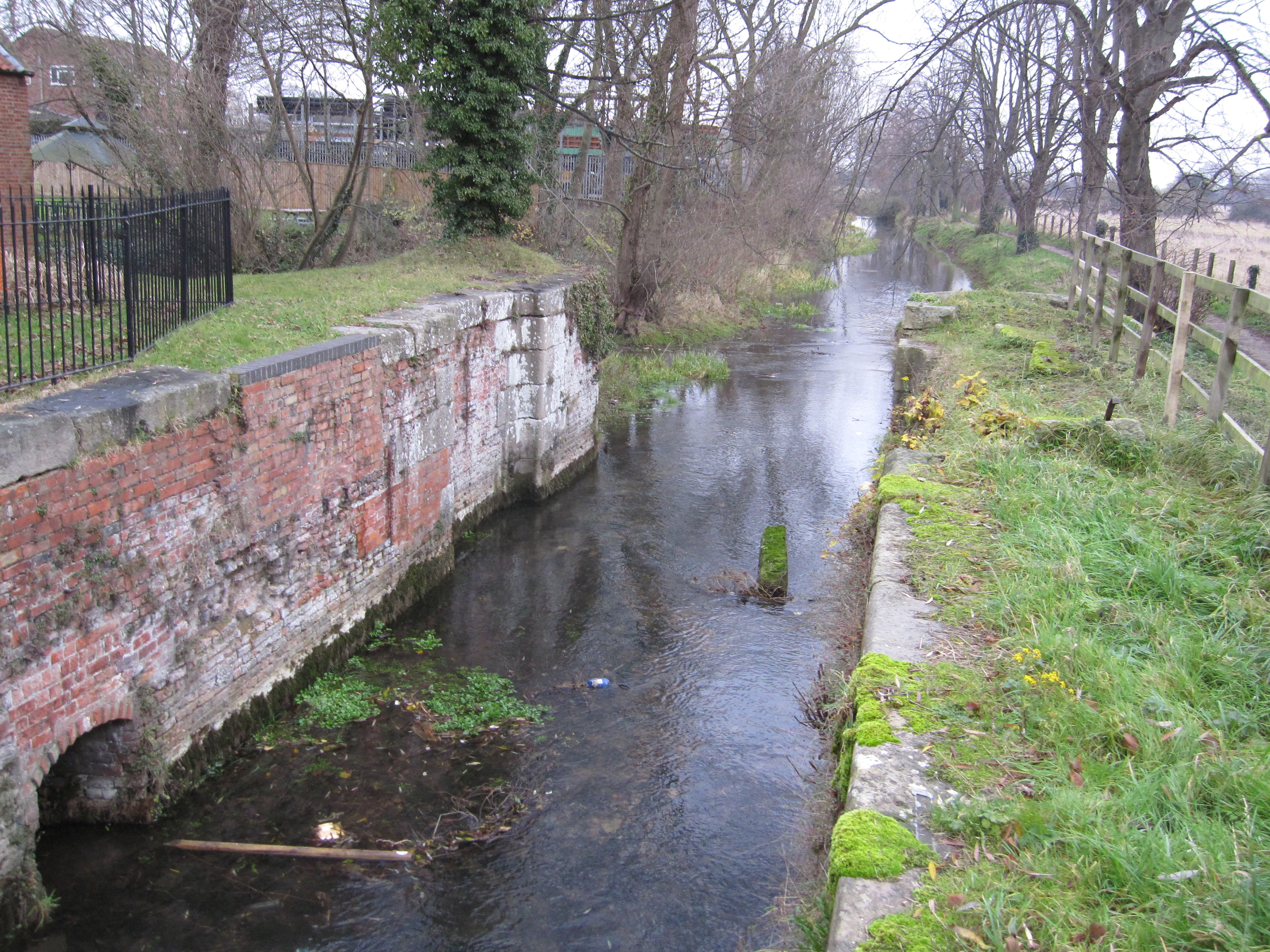
Remains of the Lock chamber at Cogglesford Mill. The upstream gate has been replaced with a sluice to maintain the head for the mill, which is still in use.

The upper terminus of the canal was at Navigation Yard, near Sleaford town centre. Navigation House, the former residence of the clerk, is now a Grade II listed building, and has been refurbished. It houses an interpretation centre where visitors can learn of the history of the canal. The River Slea between Navigation Yard and Bone Mill lock is owned by the Canal Trust. A short distance below the terminus, a new steel lift bridge crosses the canal, after which a stream leaves the east bank. This is the old course of the river, which rejoins the canal below Cobblers lock. The first lock is 0.6 miles (0.97 km) from Sleaford, and allowed boats to pass Coggesford Mill, an 18th-century watermill which has been restored, and is still used to grind flour. It is managed by North Kesteven District Council. The railway line from Lincoln to Spalding crosses next, after which Dyers Mill or Bone Mill lock is reached, 1.5 miles (2.4 km) from Sleaford and overshadowed by the A17 Sleaford bypass bridge.

Corn Mill lock is situated 2.4 miles (3.9 km) from Sleaford, and the buildings of Holdingham Mill are Grade II listed. They include a small hexagonal toll house, which was used by the lock keeper. Next is Paper Mill lock, after which the canal follows a more easterly direction, to reach Haverholme lock after 3.5 miles (5.6 km). Nearby was Haverholme Priory, founded by Gilbertine priors in 1139. The Grade II listed ruins are of a much later date, being part of a Tudor style country house built in 1835 by H. E. Kendall. The bridge over the canal, built in 1893, is also Grade II listed. At 4.7 miles (7.6 km), Cobblers lock is reached, which has been the limit of navigation since 1986. Just beyond it, there is a pumping station on the south bank and the canal makes a right-angle bend, to skirt Ewerby Waithe Common, after which there is another right angle bend by Ferry Farm, where Ferry Bridge now carries Ferry Lane over the canal. After a short distance, there is a bend called Heckington Tunnel, where a section of the Car Dyke, a Roman waterway which ran for 85 miles (137 km), heads off in a southerly direction, with the Midfodder Drain running parallel to it.

Somewhere here, the name of the river changes from the Slea to the Kyme Eau. The village of South Kyme follows, with its four-storey fortified tower, built in the 14th century for Sir Gilbert d'Umframville. It is 77 feet (23 m) high, and was surrounded by a moat. Two road bridges and a footbridge cross the navigation in the village. Damford Grounds, a low-lying area of fenland, lies to the north of the village, and Damford Drain, the main drainage ditch, is pumped into the river by a pumping station on the west bank. After passing Terry Booth Farm on the east bank, the 18th century buildings of which are Grade II listed, and a farm with the same name on the west bank, Lower Kyme lock is reached, 10.6 miles (17.1 km) from Sleaford. The Twenty Foot Drain and its pumping station join the river as it makes another sharp turn to the east, to reach a set of flood doors and Chapel Hill bridge, beyond which is the River Witham, flowing south-east to Boston.

== Points of interest ==
Point	Coordinates (Links to map resources)	OS Grid Ref	Notes
Chapel Hill flood doors	53.0702°N 0.1991°W	TF207540	Junction with River Witham
Lower Kyme lock	53.0550°N 0.2160°W	TF196523	
South Kyme	53.0306°N 0.2517°W	TF173495	
Cobblers lock	53.0330°N 0.3198°W	TF127497	
Haverholme lock	53.0315°N 0.3541°W	TF104495	
Paper Mill lock	53.0223°N 0.3794°W	TF087484	
Corn Mill lock	53.0179°N 0.3785°W	TF088479	
Bone Mill lock	53.0104°N 0.3852°W	TF084471	
Coggeshall Mill lock	53.0018°N 0.3994°W	TF075461	
Canal Head	52.9983°N 0.4067°W	TF070457	Terminus
Castle Causeway	52.9971°N 0.4166°W	TF063455	Statutory terminus

== Water quality ==
The Environment Agency measure the water quality of the river systems in England. Each is given an overall ecological status, which may be one of five levels: high, good, moderate, poor and bad. There are several components that are used to determine this, including biological status, which looks at the quantity and varieties of invertebrates, angiosperms and fish. Chemical status, which compares the concentrations of various chemicals against known safe concentrations, is rated good or fail.

The water quality of the Sleaford Navigation and the upper River Slea was as follows in 2019.

Section	Ecological Status	Chemical Status	Length	Catchment	Channel
Slea	Moderate	Fail	14.7 miles (23.7 km)	20.52 square miles (53.1 km^{2})	heavily modified
Kyme Eau	Poor	Fail	7.9 miles (12.7 km)	3.92 square miles (10.2 km^{2})	artificial

Reasons for the water quality being less than good include physical modification to the channel, which prevents free movement of fish and other organisms along its length, discharge from sewage treatment works, and surface and groundwater abstraction, which affects the flow. Like most rivers in the UK, the chemical status changed from good to fail in 2019, due to the presence of polybrominated diphenyl ethers (PBDE), perfluorooctane sulphonate (PFOS) and mercury compounds, none of which had previously been included in the assessment.

== See also ==
- Canals of the United Kingdom
- History of the British canal system

== Bibliography ==
- Boyes, John; Russell, Ronald (1977). The Canals of Eastern England. David and Charles. ISBN 978-0-7153-7415-3.
- Gilbert, L.A. (1966). Banks, Sir Joseph (1743–1820). Australian Dictionary of Biography. Melbourne University Press. Archived from the original on 7 March 2020.
- Hayes, Chris (March 2008). "All I want for Christmas...". Newsletter 15. Lincolnshire Waterways Partnership.
- Hayes, Chris (October 2010). "Congratulations and Celebrations". Newsletter 23. Lincolnshire Waterways Partnership.
- Hayes, Steve (March 2009). "Sleaford Bridge Installation". Newsletter 18. Lincolnshire Waterways Partnership.
- Pawley, Simon (2001). "A brief history of the Slea". Sleaford Navigation Trust. Archived from the original on 10 March 2005.
- Priestley, Joseph (1831). "Historical Account of the Navigable Rivers, Canals, and Railways of Great Britain". Archived from the original on 8 March 2016.
- Pullen, David (March 2010). "The Sleaford Slipway Project". Newsletter 21. Lincolnshire Waterways Partnership.
- Skempton, Sir Alec; et al. (2002). A Biographical Dictionary of Civil Engineers in Great Britain and Ireland: Vol 1: 1500 to 1830. Thomas Telford. ISBN 978-0-7277-2939-2.
- Squires, Roger (2008). Britain's restored canals. Landmark Publishing. ISBN 978-1-84306-331-5.
