= Ewerby and Evedon =

Civil parish in Lincolnshire, England

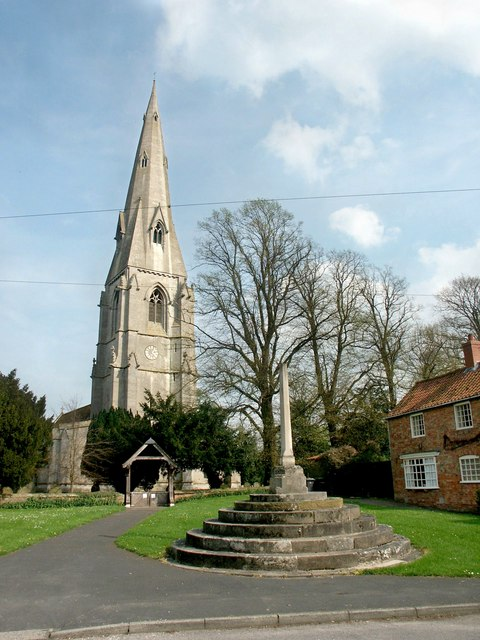
- Ewerby

- Location within Lincolnshire
- Population: 509 (2011 census)
- Civil parish: Ewerby and Evedon
- District: South Kesteven
- Shire county: Lincolnshire
- Region: East Midlands
- Country: England
- Sovereign state: United Kingdom

Ewerby and Evedon is a civil parish in North Kesteven, Lincolnshire, England. It includes the villages of Ewerby and Evedon, the hamlet of Haverholme, and is situated immediately east of Sleaford. The population of the civil parish at the 2011 census was 509.

== Geography ==
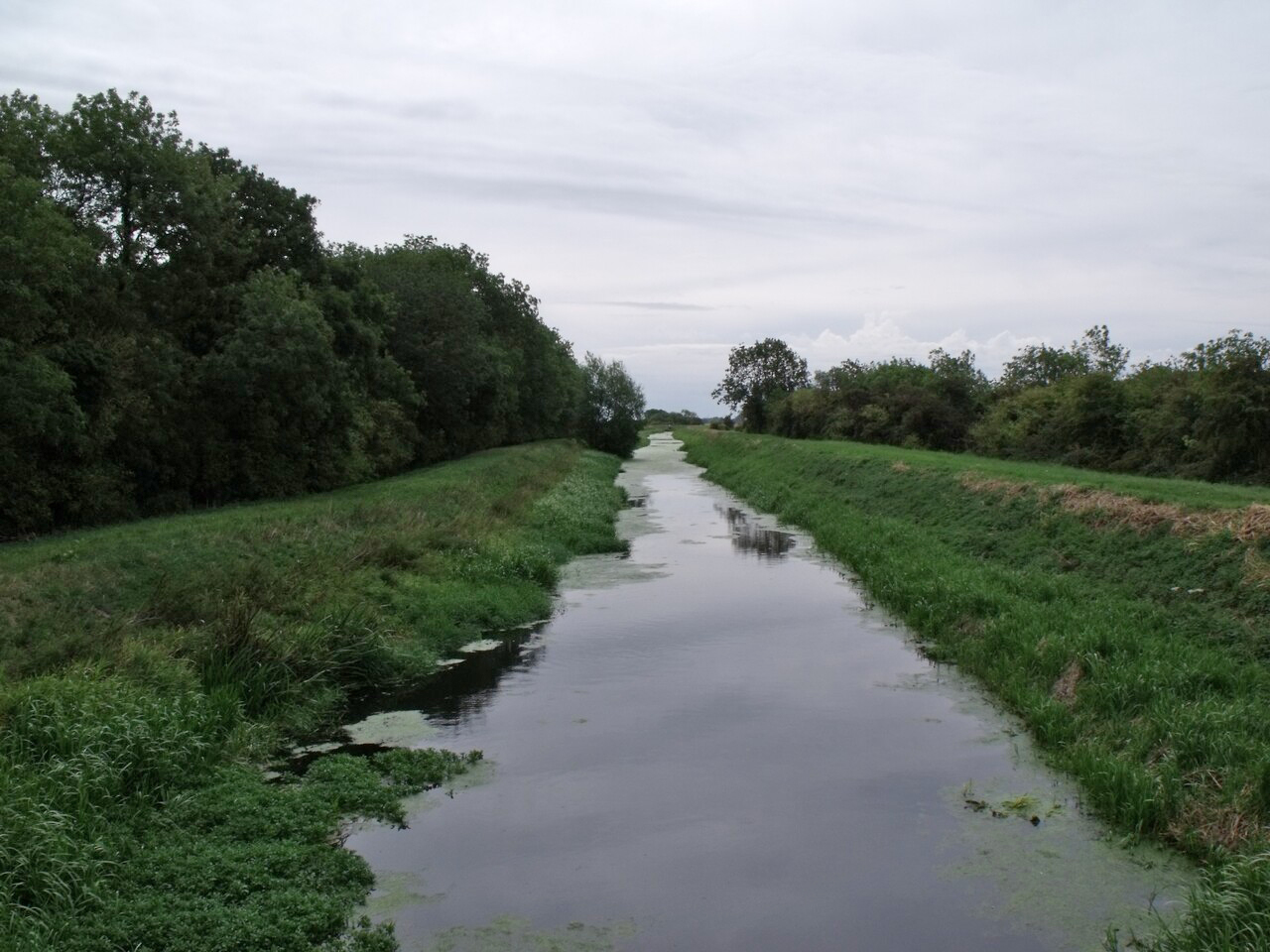
The Slea Navigation from Ferry Farm bridge, looking South. The parish is on the right bank.

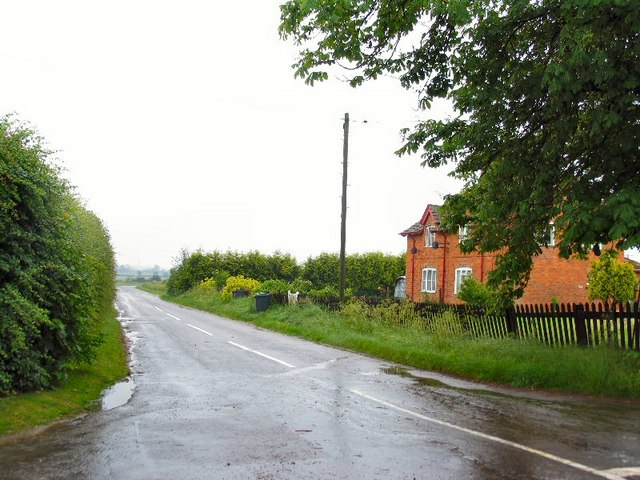
Ewerby Thorpe

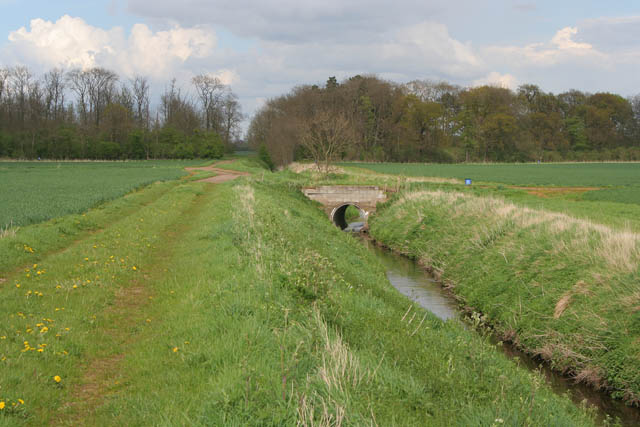
The old course of the River Slea near Evedon Wood

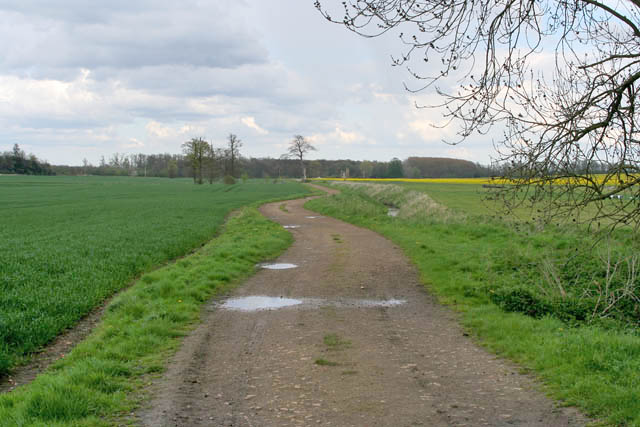
Haverholme Park

The northern boundary of the parish follows the course of the Sleaford Navigation, and the old course of the River Slea runs within the parish from west to east, joining the navigation just below Cobbler's Lock. The extreme western tip of the parish pushes into Sleaford and the eastern side is demarked by a short section of the Navigation, and further by a minor drain continuous with it, the Midfodder dike (a local name for the Roman Car Dyke). The Southern edge, along Ewerby Fen, is traced by a field drain and the Hodge Dyke, which is drained into the Car Dyke by a pumping station.

The tapering western tip of the parish is traversed by the Sleaford avoiding line of the railway, and the A17 Sleaford bypass. At the North Eastern corner of the parish the place-names Ferry Lane and Ferry Farm point to the former ferry over the modern Slea Navigation.

Most of the parish is about 33 feet (10 m) above sea level, only Ewerby village itself rising above 49 feet (15 m), and in places above 66 feet (20 m) altitude. The Parish is generally open fields, with some woodland, one of whose names belies their purpose: Fox Covert.

Throughout the parish the bedrock is a Jurassic Sedimentary mudstone, of the Oxford clay formation. This is covered with Glacial Till from the quaternary ice age.

=== Settlements ===
- Ewerby 53°00′47″N 0°19′44″W
- Ewerby Thorpe 53°00′52″N 0°18′42″W
- Evedon 53°00′49″N 0°21′58″W
- Haverholme 53°01′58″N 0°20′54″W

=== Other Locations ===
- The site of Haverholme Priory 53°03′20″N 0°20′52″W The Gilbertine house of St Mary, founded in 1139 and dissolved in 1539.
- The site of a Heronry in Haverholme Wood 53°01′24″N 0°20′56″W
- Ewerby Waithe Common53°01′53″N 0°17′27″W Site of Twelve Drain bridge, A bridge which, surprisingly, is not over the Twelve Drain, which is some yards away
- Ewerby Fen53°01′16″N 0°17′24″W The lowest part of the parish, no more than 3M above sea level.
- Hallgarth53°00′22″N 0°20′10″W The remains of a moat, or ornamental pond.
