= Christopher Chancellor =

British journalist and administrator

Sir Christopher John Howard Chancellor CMG (29 March 1904 – 9 September 1989) was a British journalist and administrator who was general manager of the news agency Reuters from 1944 to 1959. The Daily Telegraph credited him for keeping the company running under extremely difficult wartime circumstances, noting that "It was largely thanks to Chancellor that Reuters had survived the war intact, despite the loss for several years of the greatest part of its world market." By 1951, at the firm's 100th anniversary, Chancellor was credited with tripling the agency's correspondents and revenues.

== Biography ==
Chancellor was son of Lt. Col. Sir John Robert Chancellor GCMG GCVO GBE DSO (1870–1952), a colonial administrator. He was educated at Eton College and Trinity College, Cambridge. Chancellor joined Reuters in 1930 and remained with the agency for 29 years.

Based in Shanghai from 1931 to 1939 with his young family, he kept the agency's China service operating after the Japanese invasion in 1932. He returned to London during World War II, and worked with William Moloney and William Haley in reorganising Reuters' news and business operations, succeeding Sir Roderick Jones as the general manager of Reuters in 1944.

Chancellor was appointed Companion of the Order of St Michael and St George (CMG) in the 1948 Birthday Honours and knighted in the 1951 Birthday Honours. He died at Wincanton, in southwest England, at age 85.

== Family ==
In 1926, Chancellor married Sylvia Mary Paget (1901–1996), daughter of Sir Richard Paget and philanthropist Lady Muriel Finch-Hatton, daughter of Murray Finch-Hatton, 12th Earl of Winchilsea. Sylvia was made OBE in 1976 for her philanthropic activities. Among their children were John Paget Chancellor (1927–2014), editor of the encyclopædia Knowledge, and Alexander Chancellor, editor of The Spectator. Their grandchildren include actresses Anna Chancellor and Dolly Wells, model Cecilia Chancellor, and financial historian Edward Chancellor.
