= Evedon =

Village in the North Kesteven district of Lincolnshire, England

Coordinates: 53.013492°N 0.366604°W

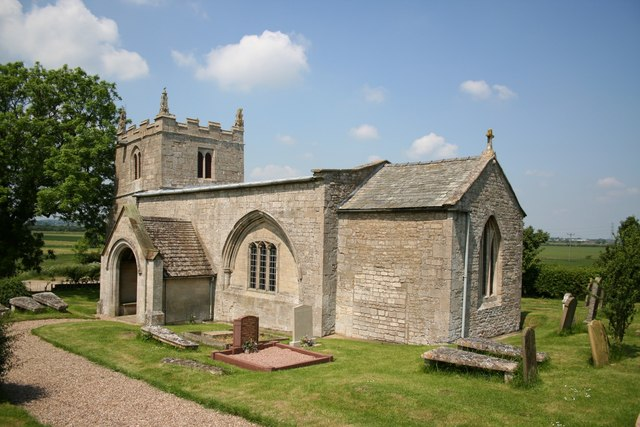
- Church of St Mary, Evedon

- Location within Lincolnshire
- OS grid reference: TF096474
  - London: 100 mi (160 km) S
- Civil parish: Ewerby and Evedon
- District: North Kesteven
- Shire county: Lincolnshire
- Region: East Midlands
- Country: England
- Sovereign state: United Kingdom
- Post town: Sleaford
- Postcode district: NG34
- Police: Lincolnshire
- Fire: Lincolnshire
- Ambulance: East Midlands
- UK Parliament: Sleaford and North Hykeham

Evedon is a village in the civil parish of Ewerby and Evedon, in the North Kesteven district of Lincolnshire, England. It is situated 2 miles (3.2 km) north-east from the town of Sleaford.

In 1885 Kelly's Directory noted that Evedon was a parish of 1,333 acres (5 km^{2}) and three farms, on heavy soil that produced crops of wheat, oats, beans, barley and turnips, and seeds – small potatoes used as seed stock. Parish population in 1881 was 73, with Murray Finch-Hatton as sole landowner. The parish was entitled to send children to Sleaford Grammar School, and two to the Free School at Ewerby. The parish register dates from 1599. By 1933 parish land had increased to 1,647 acres (7 km^{2}), with 5 acres of water – population in 1921 was now 81. There were still three farms, with two farm bailiffs, and a dairyman. The nearest money order and telephone office was at Ewerby.

The former civil parish of Evedon was amalgamated on 1 April 1931 with that of Ewerby, to form "Ewerby and Evedon".

The parish church, dedicated to Saint Mary, is a Grade II* listed building dating from the 13th century and restored in 1898, and built of limestone.

Evedon Manor House, once the seat of the Bertie family, is a Grade II listed 16th-century house built from limestone, with 19th-century alterations.
