= Haverholme =

Hamlet in Lincolnshire, England

Coordinates: 53.030800°N 0.349301°W

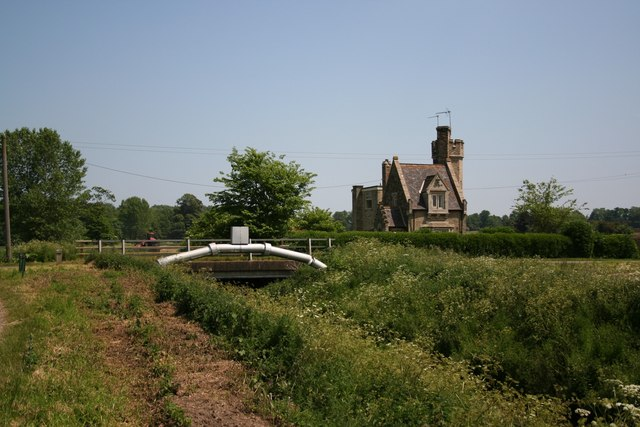
- Haverholme Priory Lodge

- Location within Lincolnshire
- OS grid reference: TF107494
  - London: 100 mi (160 km) S
- Civil parish: Ewerby and Evedon
- District: North Kesteven
- Shire county: Lincolnshire
- Region: East Midlands
- Country: England
- Sovereign state: United Kingdom
- Post town: Sleaford
- Postcode district: NG34
- Police: Lincolnshire
- Fire: Lincolnshire
- Ambulance: East Midlands
- UK Parliament: Sleaford and North Hykeham

Haverholme is a hamlet and site of Haverholme Priory in the North Kesteven district of Lincolnshire, England. It is situated about 4 miles (6 km) north-east from the town of Sleaford, and in the civil parish of Ewerby and Evedon.

Haverholme was a civil parish between 1858 and 1931.

Haverholme Priory a Gilbertine priory of Saint Mary founded in 1139 and dissolved in 1539, was located here. The site is now scheduled.

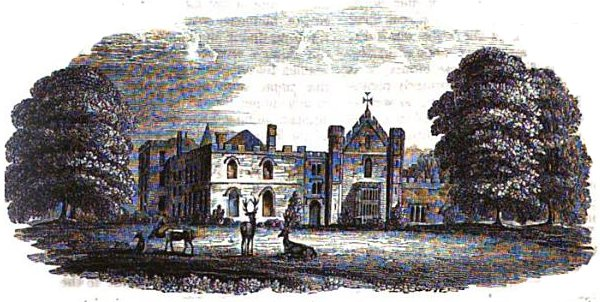
Haverholme Priory mansion in 1826

A red-brick and limestone mansion house, also called Haverholme Priory, and dating from 1780 was built on the same site. It was later rebuilt by H. E. Kendall in 1835, which was the seat of the Finch-Hatton family. The house fell into disrepair in the early 20th century and today only a fragment remains, which is Grade II listed.
