= Children's Order of Chivalry =

The Children's Order of Chivalry was an English society which expressed its rules as "Gentleness, Honour and Love". Founded by English aristocrats in the late nineteenth century and enjoying royal patronage, the society grew quickly. It aimed to improve understanding and sympathy between rich and poor, and encouraged well-off children to correspond with, and occasionally host, poor children from the East End of London.

== Foundation and patronage ==
The society was established in 1893 by the Earl of Winchilsea and his wife the Countess, in memory of their only son, George Edward Henry, Viscount Maidstone ("Maidy"), who had died the previous year at the age of nine. Prior to his death, the child had discussed with his father the idea of establishing the Order. The bereaved parents were assisted in the foundation of the society by their daughter Lady Muriel Finch-Hatton (later famed for her many philanthropic works). Among its patrons were Princess Victor of Hohenlohe-Langenburg who was the society's "Grand Princess"; the members included four Battenberg children of Princess Beatrice (Queen Victoria's youngest child).

In 1898, the head office of the society was in London. The Order was still in existence in 1907.

== Membership ==
Initially the membership was principally drawn from the counties of Northamptonshire and Lincolnshire. By 1895 the original membership of a dozen had expanded to over 10,000, with 300 associates over the age of 17 called the Elder Children. Five hundred of these children had established friendships with London children by that year. By the end of the following year the membership numbered 12,000, and reached 13,000 in 1898, the year of Lord Winchilsea's death.

== Aims and objectives ==
The society's motto, quoting Shakespeare's Antony and Cleopatra, 4.13.87, was "What's brave, what's noble, let's do it". This motto appeared on the logo together with a woodcut likeness of Maidy in an Eton collar. Its rules were "Gentleness, Honour and Love"; and its stated object was "to bind together, with the threefold cord of gentleness, honour and love, children belonging to every sphere of life, so that by kind words and deeds passing betwixt one and the other, more especially from the rich to the poor, a spirit of sympathy and large-heartedness may be encouraged in early life."

With a view to personal connections being established, the wealthy children would send the London child "clothes, boots and some of their pocket money, and [issue] invitations to holiday in the family home outside of London": this would encourage "social and moral responsibility amongst the children of the wealthy classes".

== Activities ==
An American account of 1895 describes its activities thus:

The rich boy or girl becomes the fairy godmother or Santa Claus of a poor child: he sends the little waif his old clothes, he personally packs up the pair of boots that will keep the little feet from the London stones. He saves a trifle out of his pocket money to give that child some little present, or a treat. He gets his mother to invite the London waif down into the country for a fortnight or maybe a month. The street arab is thus not boarded out with dozens of other children, but comes alone as the guest of the rich boy. The waif is located in the lodge or the gardener's cottage, and during his stay the rich child devotes so much time every day to play with the town streetling, and in this way the rich and the poor children get to understand one another.

The activities included a rural meet in the south-east organised for a thousand East End children, a London tea with music and a cinematograph exhibition for 1500 poor children, a Christmas party at St Mark's Hall in the East End for three hundred children (which featured a fifteen-foot tree), and large picnics including competitive sports held for the members and their London counterparts, the first of which was held in the grounds of the Earl's semi-ruined ancestral home, Kirby Hall, Northamptonshire. At this picnic, attended by 300-400 children, 'a grand investiture' of the Order was led by Lady Winchilsea. The railway companies assisted the work of the Order by carrying the London children at greatly reduced fares.

Shortly after the society was established, the Earl and Countess of Winchilsea founded a temporary convalescent home for poor 'companions' of the Order in the village of Ewerby, close to the family's Lincolnshire estate.

The Order was featured each month in the 'Companions' section of Lord Winchilsea's weekly agricultural paper The Cable, and membership forms were printed in the paper: membership entitled children to take part in competitions and to write for advice and help on any subject.
