= Lady Muriel Paget =

British humanitarian relief worker

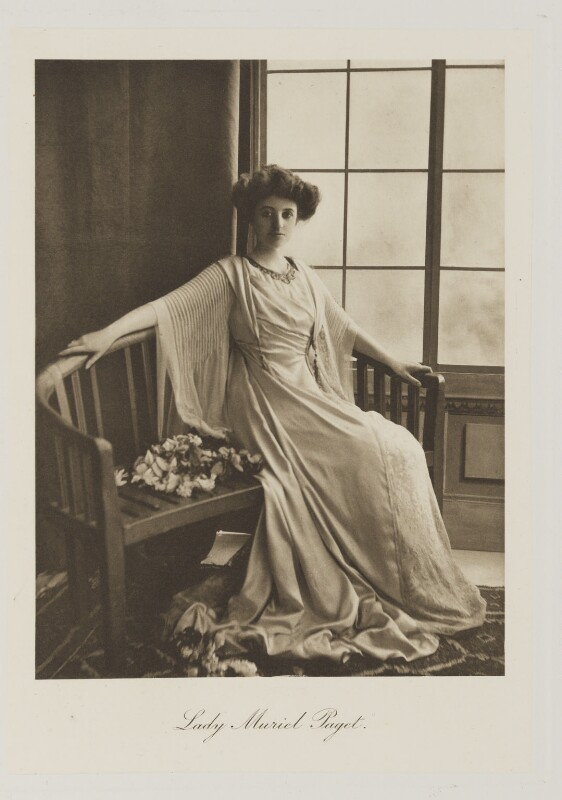
- Lady Muriel Paget, published in 1909
- Born: Muriel Evelyn Vernon Finch-Hatton; 19 August 1876; Knightsbridge, London, England
- Died: 16 June 1938 (aged 61); Marylebone, London, England
- Spouse: Richard Paget (m. 1897)
- Children: 5
- Father: Murray Finch-Hatton
- Relatives: Edward William Harcourt (grandfather)

Lady Muriel Evelyn Vernon Paget CBE DStJ (née Finch-Hatton; 19 August 1876 – 16 June 1938) was a British philanthropist and humanitarian relief worker, initially based in London, and later in Eastern and Central Europe. She was made an OBE in 1918 and promoted to CBE in 1938. She received awards in recognition of her humanitarian work from the governments of Belgium, Czechoslovakia, Estonia, Japan, Latvia, Lithuania, Romania, and Imperial Russia. In 1916 she was invested as a Dame of Grace of the Order of St John.

== Family ==
Lady Muriel Finch-Hatton was born at 18, Ennismore Gardens in Knightsbridge, the elder of the two children of Murray Finch-Hatton, 12th Earl of Winchilsea, of Haverholme Priory and Edith Harcourt, daughter of Edward William Harcourt and Lady Susan Holroyd. Muriel's paternal grandmother was Fanny Margaretta Rice, great niece of Jane Austen and daughter of Elizabeth Austen Knight. She was educated privately at home. Her brother George, Viscount Maidstone, to whom she was greatly attached, died aged nine, in 1892.

She married Richard Arthur Surtees Paget (who later became the second Baronet Paget of Cranmore) on 31 May 1897. They had five children, the first of whom (Richard Hatton Harcourt Paget; 6 March 1898 – October 1898) died in infancy. The surviving children were:

- Sylvia Mary Paget, Lady Chancellor (10 July 1901 – 29 October 1996); married Sir Christopher Chancellor. Her grandchildren include actresses Anna Chancellor and Dolly Wells.
- Pamela Winefred Paget, Lady Glenconner (7 August 1903 – 1989); married Christopher Tennant, Baron Glenconner
- Angela Sibell Paget, Lady Debenham (14 November 1906 – 16 June 1965); married Sir Piers Debenham Bt.
- Sir John Starr Paget (25 November 1914 – 1992); married Nancy Mary Parish, great-granddaughter of William Ewart Gladstone, four times Prime Minister of the United Kingdom.

== Invalid kitchens of London ==
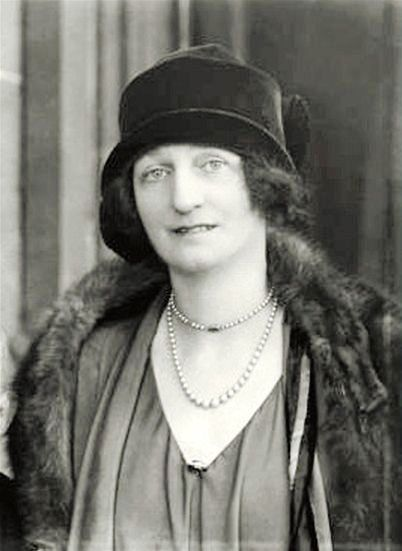
Lady Muriel Paget published in 1926.

After an initial involvement in co-founding the Children's Order of Chivalry, a society that linked wealthy children with poor London children, Lady Muriel became involved in charity work when, in 1905, she responded to a suggestion made by an aunt that she might take up the post of honorary secretary of a charity seeking to establish a kitchen in Southwark (the Southwark Invalid Kitchen). The aim of this charity was to provide, at the nominal cost of 1d, well-prepared and nourishing meals for expectant and nursing mothers, sick children, and convalescents whose would otherwise have been unable to afford them. The kitchen was situated in Scovell Road, with meals being served between 12 noon and 1 p.m. Later on, the charity's rules were revised and the charges were assessed according to the earning capacity of each individual's family. The intention was that these meals would be provided to cases recommended by a doctor, a hospital, or by other approved agencies.

Through fundraising, similar kitchens were later founded in various other areas of London through the Invalid Kitchens of London movement (which evolved from the Southwark Invalid Kitchen), under the patronage of Queen Mary. After the outbreak of the First World War, it necessary to increase the number of kitchens dramatically, partly because so many hospital places had to be allocated for the treatment of wounded soldiers (which meant that other patients were obliged to convalesce at home), and partly because there were wounded soldiers who themselves were recovering at home rather than in the hospitals. In 1915, the number of kitchens increased from 17 to 29, although the numbers tended to fluctuate in proportion to the amount of funding available.

The work of the Invalid Kitchens of London continued after the War. A new kitchen was opened by the Duchess of Somerset at Windsor Street, Essex Road on 17 November 1920. Three thousand more dinners had been served in 1920 when compared with 1919, and a Christmas appeal for £10,000 was launched that December. Lady Muriel was still the honorary secretary of the organisation at that time.

== War work in connection with the Eastern Front ==
In 1915, concerned by what she had learned of the situation on the Russian front, Lady Muriel traveled to Petrograd, where she and her friend Lady Sybil Grey set up the Anglo-Russian Hospital for treatment of wounded soldiers. This was based in the Dmitri Palace, and was formally opened on 19 January 1916 (O.S.). The Empress Alexandra Feodorovna was involved in the funding of this project, and other major donations came from the UK. In 1916 Lady Muriel also established a number of field hospitals and food kitchens in Ukraine.

In 1917, to raise funds for the Anglo-Russian hospitals, she organized a large Russian exhibition on the theme of "Russia in Peace and War" at the Grafton Galleries in London, which ran through May of that year. The exhibition included a series of Russian concerts (where Feodor Chaliapin sang to raise money for her), lectures on various Russian-related topics, dramatic performances of Anton Chekhov and Leo Tolstoy, etc. The opening ceremony, presided over by Lord French, was preceded by a Russian Orthodox religious service.

Shortly after the exhibition, she returned to Russia. However, in February 1918, in the wake of the Bolshevik coup d'état, the majority of the British staff at the Anglo-Russian Hospital in Petrograd returned to the UK, leaving a Russian Red Cross commission with supplies for a further six months. Lady Muriel remained in Ukraine, but she, along with three of her nursing sisters and a doctor, a number of British civilians, and the British diplomat John Picton Bagge, had to be evacuated from Russia very soon afterwards, traveling back to the UK via Moscow, Vladivostok, Tokyo (17 April), Toronto (7 May), and the United States. In the party with her was Dr. Thomas Marsdon, a pseudonym for Dr. Thomas Masaryk, who escaped incognito from Eastern Europe.

An account of what she had seen and experienced in the weeks following the revolution was published in the New York Times. She arrived in London on 9 July, and was received by the King and Queen a week later. She took the opportunity to call British attention to the urgent appeals for aid and assistance being made in the US by Lt.-Col. Maria Bochkareva, foundress of the Russian Women's Battalion of Death.

== The years after World War I: an overview ==
Shortly after the end of the War, Lady Muriel returned to Russia to continue her work, and then in 1920, she directed a mission to Latvia, where she set up access to free kitchens, free medical aid and free clothing. She also inaugurated a system of travelling clinics for the benefit of those living in remote areas, and provided a new hospital at Daugavpils. During the following years, she performed similar work in Estonia, Lithuania, Poland, Czechoslovakia, and Romania, at the request of Queen Marie of Romania who became a good friend. She and her team of British nurses and volunteers laid particular emphasis on teaching the local populations the importance of taking precautions to prevent the outbreak and spread of diseases, and in some cases she arranged for nurses from these countries to receive medical training in Britain.

== Czechoslovakia ==
In February 1919, following an urgent appeal from Dr. Alice Masaryková (a.k.a. Alice G. Masaryk), chair of the Czechoslovak Red Cross and daughter of the country's first president, Dr. Tomáš Masaryk, a relief mission of the British Red Cross was dispatched with the aim of supplying Czechoslovakia with hospital necessities, milk, clothing and blankets. Lady Muriel left London on the night of 18/19 February for Prague, taking with her a consignment of medical supplies. By 12 March 1919 a new Anglo-Czech Relief Fund had been set up in London under the War Charities Act of 1916, and she remained in Prague to oversee the distribution of the goods which were sent.

To ascertain conditions in Czechoslovakia, Lady Muriel traveled over 3,000 miles by car over a six-week period to investigate. She later reported that some of the problems were caused by rampant inflation (the price of clothing, she maintained, was 1,000% higher, when compared with the pre-war rates); others had arisen because during the Russian occupation there had been widespread commandeering. Cultivation was poor, the potato crop had been destroyed, and some peasants had gone to Hungary to work there for the harvest season as was usual, only to find that they were taken prisoner by the Bolsheviks, with the result that their families at home were left without support.

== Displaced British subjects in the USSR ==
A small number of British residents in the Soviet Union were unable (for example, because of age or infirmity or poverty) – or in a few cases, unwilling – to leave Russia after the October Revolution of 1917. Since many of these were associated, in the minds of the Soviet authorities, with the employment in which they had been engaged under the Old Regime (e.g. private tutors, governesses, technical or clerical staff with British companies), their position became highly vulnerable, even though they might have married into Russian families or (in certain instances) they may have been born and brought up in Russia and spoke little or no English at all.

The British Government contributed a small amount into a fund whose purpose was to provide assistance to these expatriates in cases of particularly urgent need, and a similarly small amount had, since 1924, been allocated from Lady Paget's fund with the same intention. Soon after diplomatic relations between Britain and the USSR resumed in October 1929 (they had been broken off in May 1927), Lady Muriel decided to go to Leningrad to bring assistance. She arrived there early in 1930.

As a result of her initiatives, which included the establishment in a British Subjects in Russia Relief Organization in England, a dacha was eventually built at Detskoye Selo. This small country house was intended to serve as a retirement and convalescent home for displaced British Subjects. After some delays, the dacha opened in 1933, and was placed under the supervision of a Mrs Morley (formerly a matron at Newnham College, Cambridge). Earlier a flat in Leningrad had been obtained for a similar purpose.

== Rakovsky's statement – questions in the House of Commons ==
In March 1938, Bulgarian Christian Rakovsky, a former Soviet ambassador to the United Kingdom, was on trial in Moscow, accused with 20 others of conspiring with Leon Trotsky against Stalin and other treason. During the Show Trial, known as the Trial of the Twenty-One, Rakovsky confessed to all the charges against him. He made a statement to the court in which he declared that he had first begun spying for Britain in 1924, and, furthermore, that he had recommenced his espionage activities in 1934 at the express request of Lady Muriel Paget. Rakovsky, who had also been the Soviet ambassador to Japan, likewise confessed to being a spy for Japan. Rakovsky's statement prompted questions in the House of Commons. On 9 March 1938, Ellen Wilkinson (Labour Party MP for Jarrow) claimed Lady Muriel had "been lecturing on (her) experiences as (a member) of the British Intelligence Services".

Prime Minister Chamberlain replied that Lady Muriel had "no experience in the British Intelligence Service" and stressed that her work was "thoroughly unselfish and humanitarian". Wilkinson retorted that "those who know something about her work have reason to doubt the statement just made by the Prime Minister", and Willie Gallacher (Communist Party member for Fife West) asserted that Rakovsky was telling the truth. Chamberlain reiterated that none of the British subjects' names mentioned at the trial had ever worked for British Intelligence services, and William Leach (Labour, Bradford Central) urged the Prime Minister to take steps "to protect the innocent victims of these fantastic stories". Shortly afterwards the dacha was closed.

== Death ==
In 1938, Lady Muriel Paget died in her sleep of cancer, aged 61, at her London home, 1, Devonshire Terrace. She was buried at Cranmore, Somerset. Her home from 1901–2, 10 Cornwall Terrace, Regent's Park, London is named Paget House after her.
