= Ewerby Thorpe =

Hamlet in Lincolnshire, England

Coordinates: 53.014370°N 0.310674°W

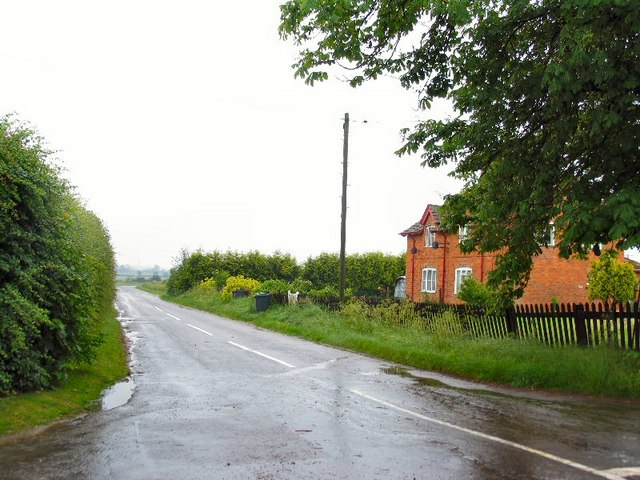

- Location within Lincolnshire
- OS grid reference: TF134476
  - London: 105 mi (169 km) S
- Civil parish: Ewerby and Evedon
- District: North Kesteven
- Shire county: Lincolnshire
- Region: East Midlands
- Country: England
- Sovereign state: United Kingdom
- Post town: Sleaford
- Postcode district: NG34
- Police: Lincolnshire
- Fire: Lincolnshire
- Ambulance: East Midlands
- UK Parliament: Sleaford and North Hykeham

Ewerby Thorpe is a hamlet in the civil parish of Ewerby and Evedon, in the North Kesteven district of Lincolnshire, England. It lies 2 miles (3.2 km) north from the A17 road, 4.5 miles (7 km) east from Sleaford, and 12 miles (19 km) west from Boston. The village of Ewerby lies just to the west, and Howell just to the south, with the River Slea running 1 mile (1.6 km) to the north.

The hamlet is the site of the ancient village of Austhorpe. In the Domesday account Austhorpe is written as "Oustorp". It consisted of 8 villagers, with 3 ploughlands, a meadow of 44 acres (0.18 km^{2}) and woodland of 23 acres (0.093 km^{2}). In 1086 lordship of the manor transferred to Kolsveinn of Lincoln.

The land immediately to the north-west, south of the River Slea and stretching to South Kyme, was known as Ewerby Thorpe Fen. In the 13th century it was the part of the manorial lands of William de la Laund. He gave Ewerby Thorpe Fen, then called le Mykeldyke, to Haverholme Priory.
