= Cansler =

Cansler is a surname. Notable people with the surname include:

- Charles W. Cansler (1871–1953), American educator, civil rights advocate and author
- Larry Cansler (born 1940), American composer, arranger, conductor, musical director and pianist

== See also ==
- Candler (surname)
- Chancellor (surname)
