= Cogglesford Mill =

Grade II listed building in Lincolnshire

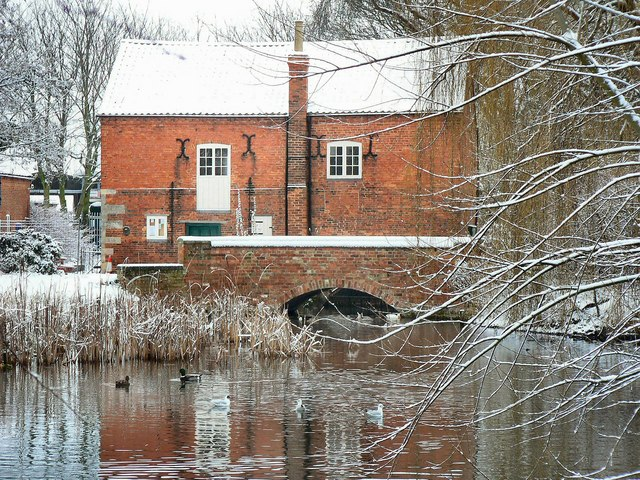
- Cogglesford Mill, 2005

- Location within Lincolnshire
- 53°00′06″N 0°24′01″W
- Type: Watermill
- Location: Sleaford
- OS grid reference: TF 07459 46128

History
- Built: Mid 18th century

Site notes
- Area: Lincolnshire
- Owner: North Kesteven District Council

Listed Building – Grade II
- Official name: Coggesford Mill, mill race and bridge
- Designated: 20 July 1973
- Reference no.: 1062115

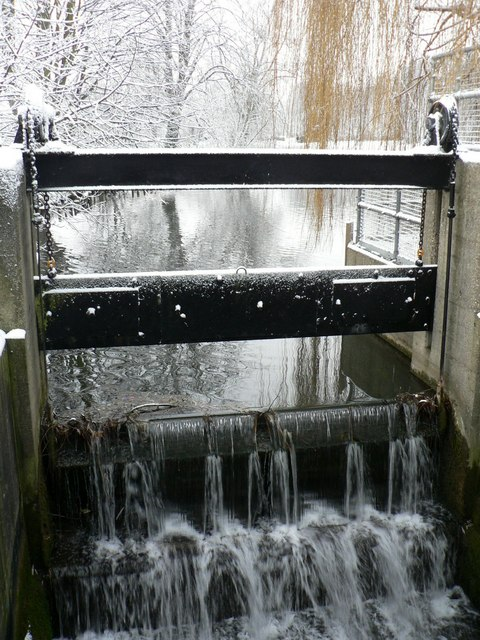
Weir at Cogglesford Mill

Cogglesford Mill (sometimes referred to as Coggesford) is a Grade II listed working watermill in Sleaford, Lincolnshire. It is possibly the last working Sheriff's Mill in England.

== Location ==
The mill sits to the north of Sleaford on banks of River Slea. The ford from which the mill takes its name is where the Roman road, now called Mareham Lane, crossed the Slea. The original crossing, no longer extant, is a few hundred yards downstream of the mill, close to the current footbridge.

== History ==
There is archaeological evidence of a Saxon mill on the site and records in the Domesday Book of later mills; the present redbrick structure dates to the mid to late 18th century, with alterations from the 19th century. There were many other mills along the river at various times. During the construction of the Sleaford Navigation, in the 1790s, locks were provided at each of the mills to maintain the necessary head of water. After the navigation closed and as the locks fell into disrepair they were replaced by weirs. The weir at Cogglesford is particularly elaborate, having to maintain the head of this still working mill.

Cogglesford mill (including the mill race and bridge) was assigned a listed status on 20 July 1973. The mill is open to the public 7 days a week during the summer and stoneground flour is milled there and sold in the shop.

== Gallery ==
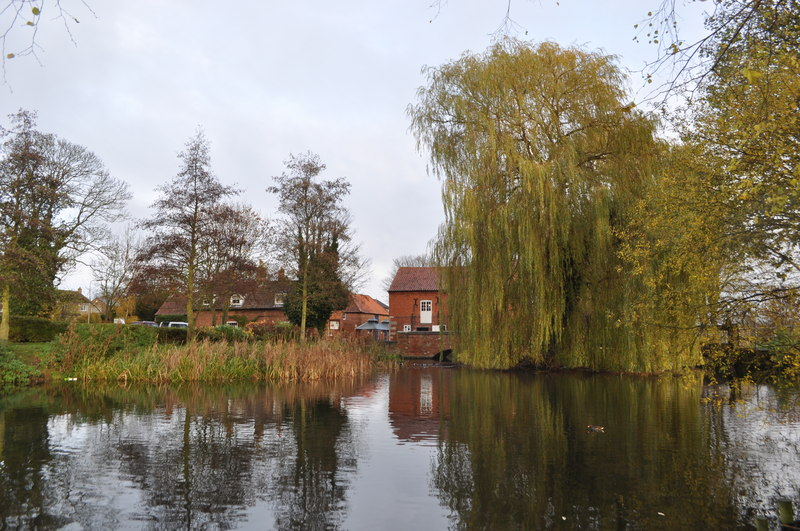
The Mill pond

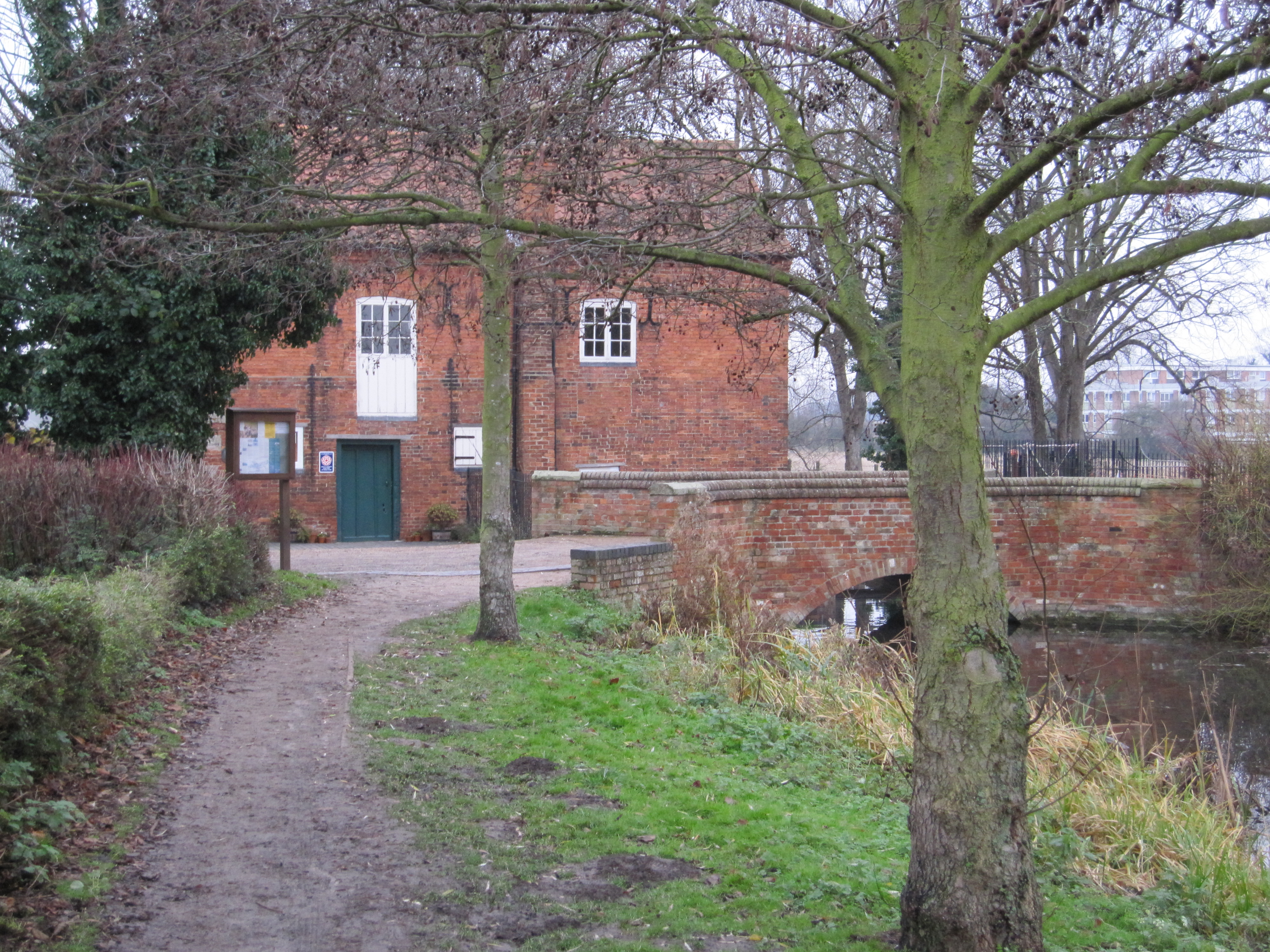
General view of the mill from upstream, with the small millpool formed by the river above the sluice.

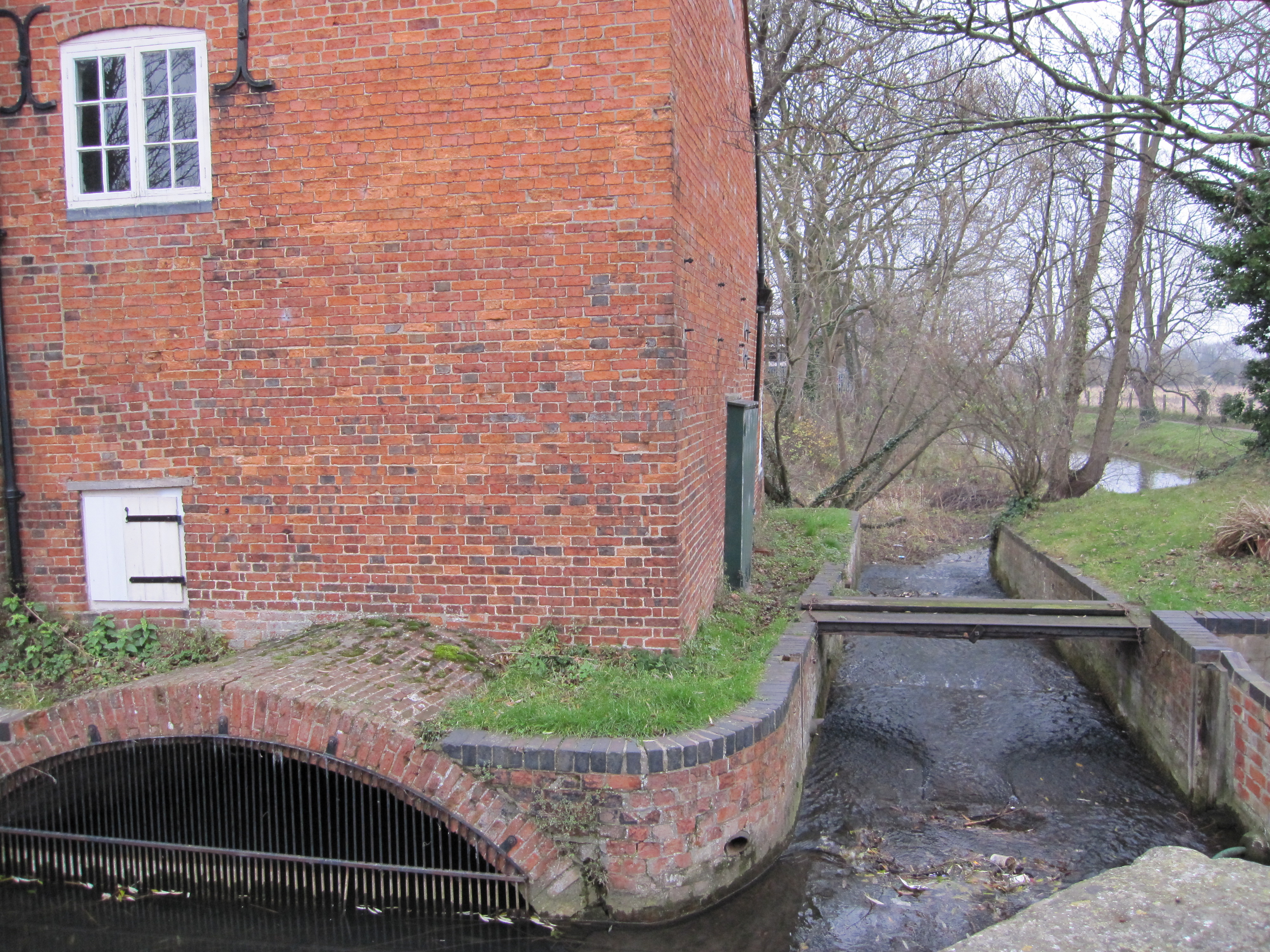
View of the entrance to the enclosed race, with the overflow weir alongside.

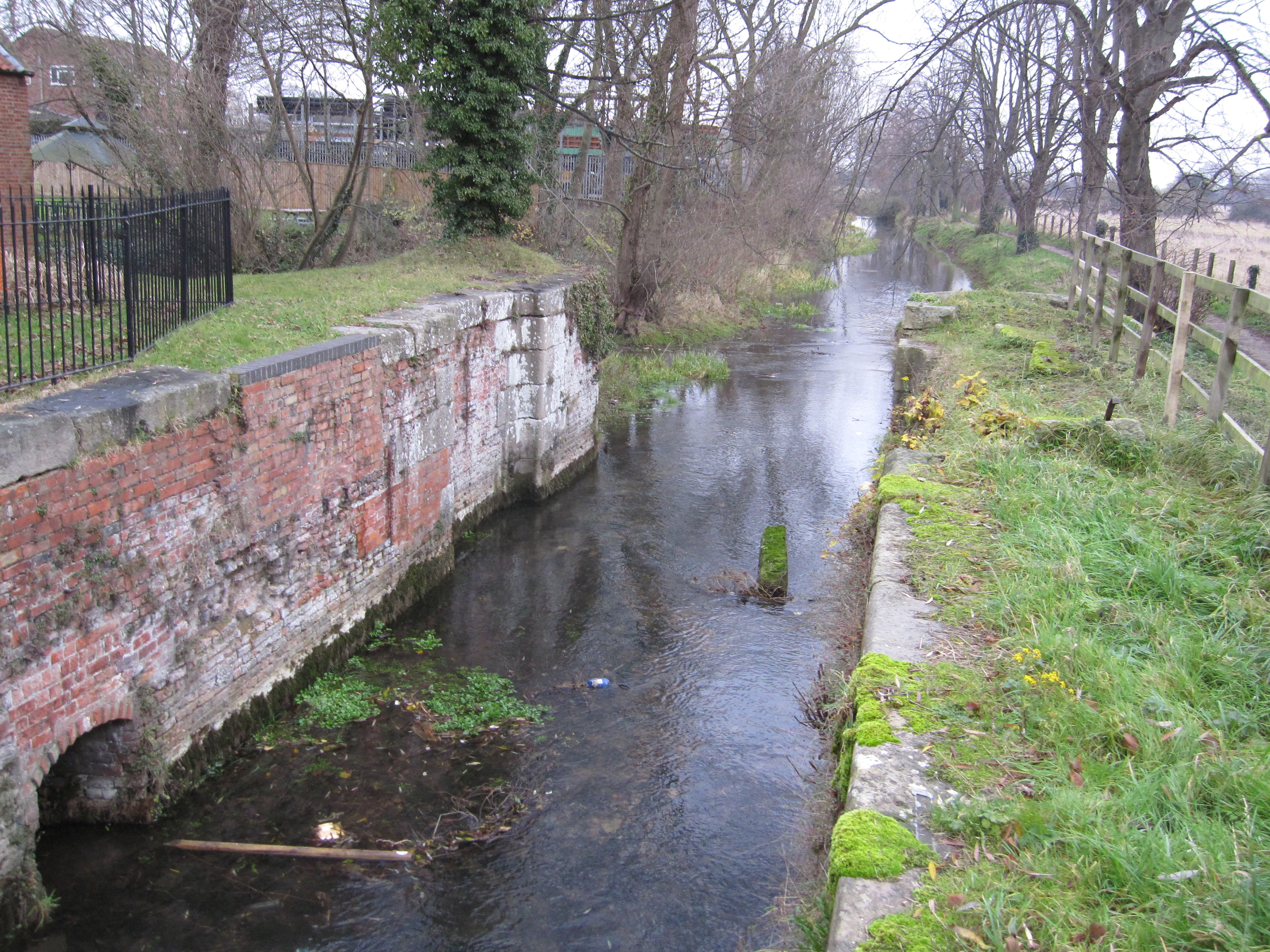
Remains of the lock constructed for the Navigation of the river.

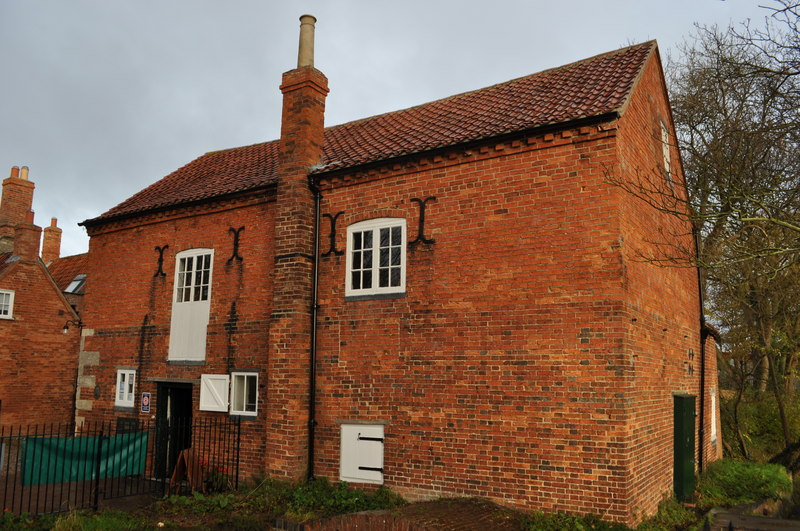
The mill in November 2010

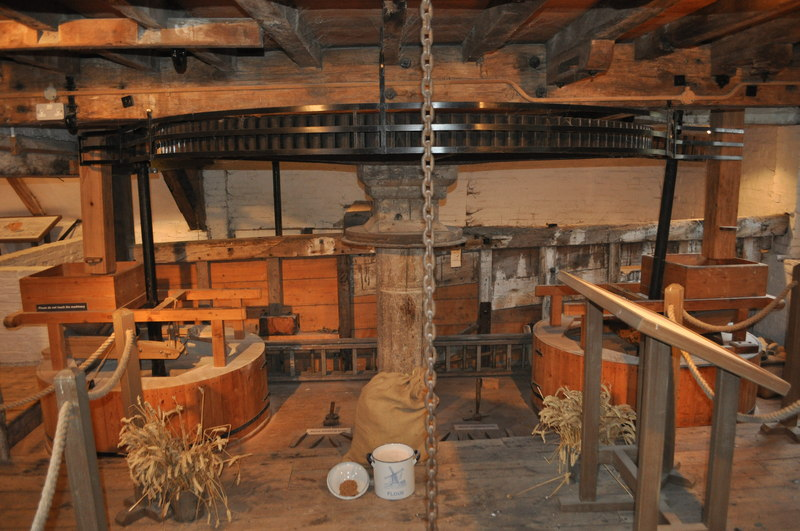
A view of the great spur wheel and stones.

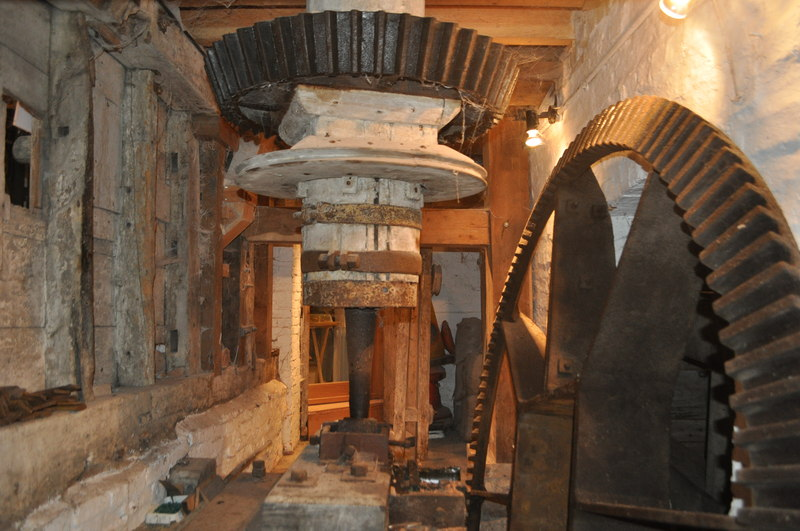
The Pit wheel and wallower

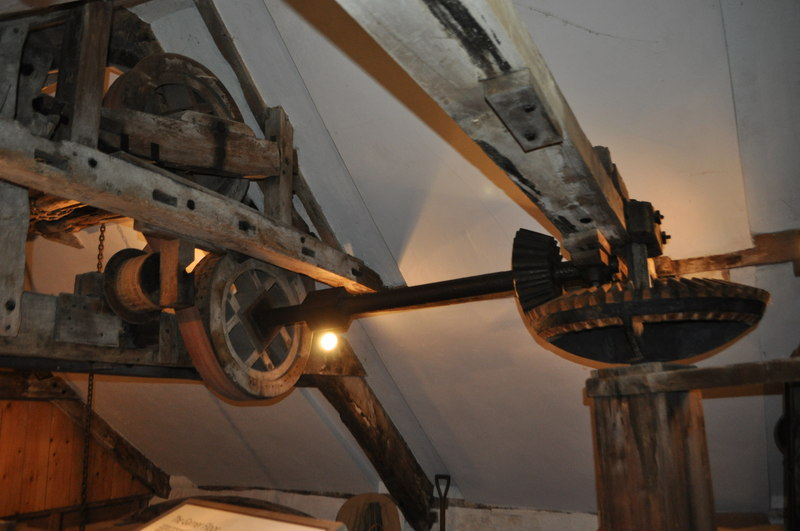
The Sack hoist
