= Murray Finch-Hatton, 12th Earl of Winchilsea =

British Conservative politician and agriculturalist

The Right Honourable The Earl of Winchilsea
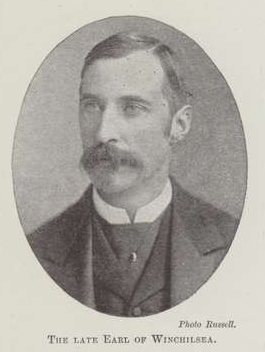

Member of Parliament for Spalding
- In office 1885–1887
- Succeeded by: Halley Stewart

Member of Parliament for Lincolnshire South
- In office 1884–1885 Serving with John Compton Lawrance
- Preceded by: Sir William Welby-Gregory; John Compton Lawrance

Personal details
- Born: Murray Edward Gordon Finch-Hatton; 28 March 1851
- Died: 7 September 1898 (aged 47)
- Spouse: Edith Harcourt (m. 1875)
- Children: 2, including Muriel
- Parents: George Finch-Hatton, 10th Earl of Winchilsea; Fanny Margaretta Rice

Murray Edward Gordon Finch-Hatton, 12th Earl of Winchilsea and 7th Earl of Nottingham (28 March 1851 – 7 September 1898), styled the Hon. Murray Finch-Hatton until 1887, was a British Conservative politician and agriculturalist. His country residence was at Haverholme Priory, Lincolnshire.

== Early life ==
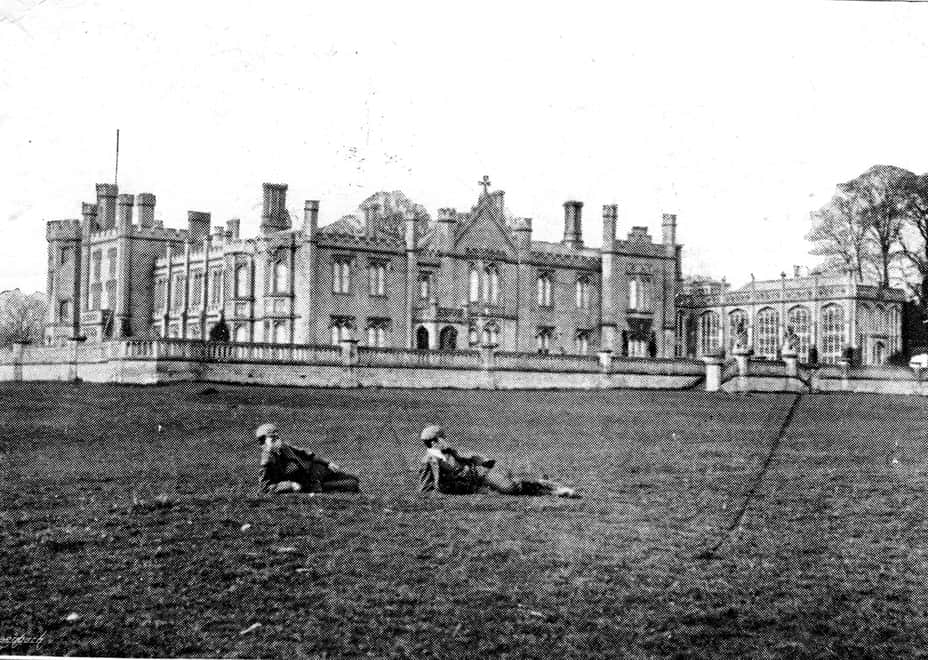
Haverholme Priory, Ewerby, Lincolnshire.

Winchilsea was the second son of George Finch-Hatton, 10th Earl of Winchilsea and 5th Earl of Nottingham and eldest son by his third wife Fanny Margaretta Rice, daughter of Edward Royd Rice and Elizabeth Austen, who herself was daughter of Edward Austen Knight, brother of Jane Austen.

Murray's paternal grandmother was Lady Elizabeth Murray. When his father the 10th Earl died, he left Haverholme Priory estate to his second son. The inherited estate generated close to £7,000 a year.

== Career ==
=== Politician ===
He unsuccessfully contested Newark in 1880 but entered Parliament for Lincolnshire South in an 1884 by-election, a seat he held until the following year when the constituency was abolished. He then represented Spalding from 1885 until 1887 when he succeeded his half-brother in the two earldoms and entered the House of Lords. His succession led to a network of legal difficulties engaging at different times, it is stated, no fewer than 22 different firms of lawyers. In 1884 Finch-Hatton, with 135 other members of Parliament, voted that a clause of the Representation of the People Act 1884 enfranchising women be read a second time.

=== Agriculturalist ===
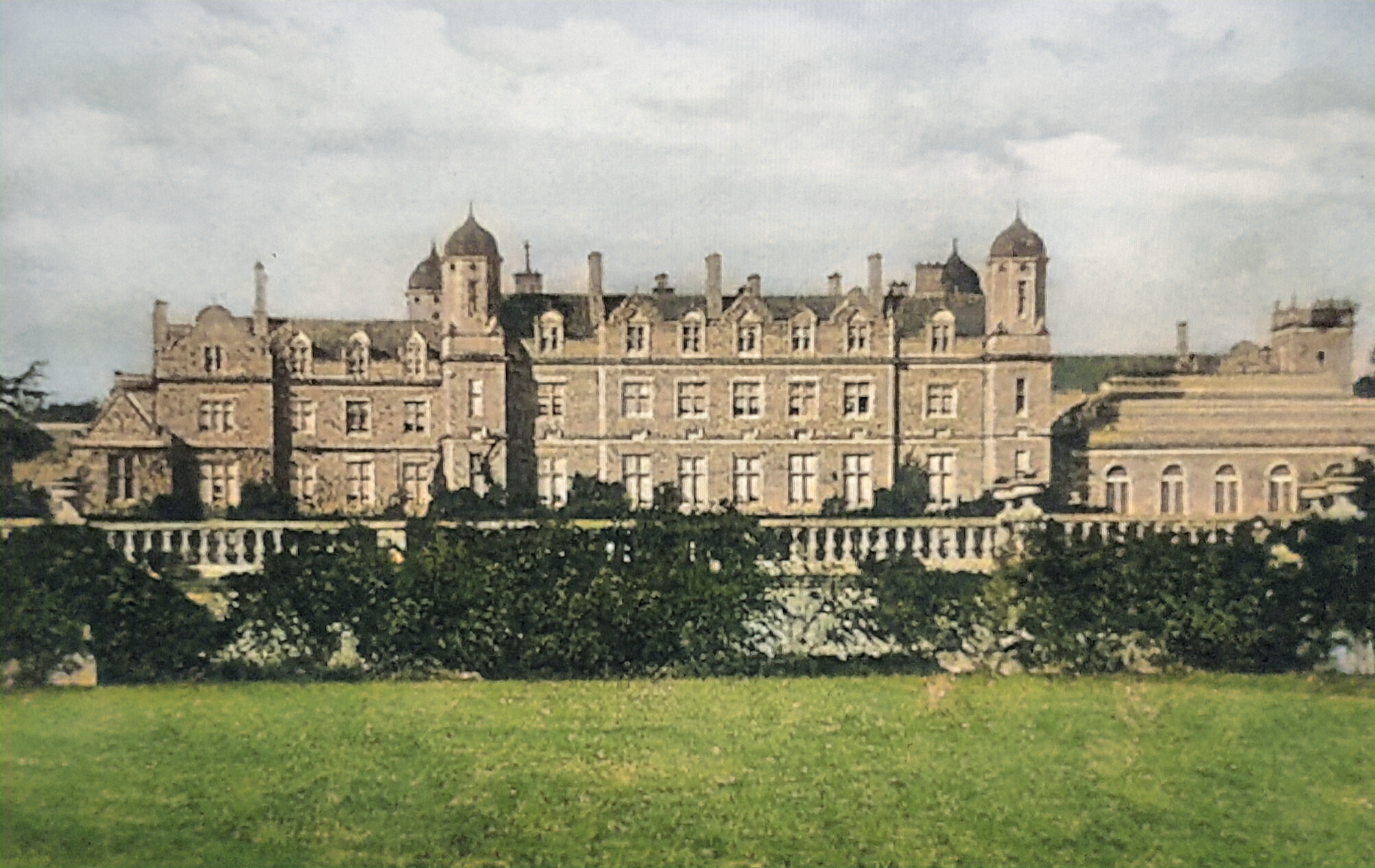
Eastwell Park, Kent. It was owned by The Earls of Winchilsea for more than three centuries. It was demolished in 1926.

He was particularly interested in agricultural questions, where he sought to improve the conditions of agricultural workers.

Obliged by the agricultural depression and huge inherited debt from his half-brother the 11th Earl of Winchilsea, Murray now the 12th Earl was forced to sell their ancestral family seat of Eastwell Park for £250,000 (equivalent to £40 million in 2025) to 2nd Baron Gerard of Garswood Hall in 1894. He became the recognised head of the movement which followed on the Agricultural Congress of 1892 and led in 1894 to the formation of The National Agricultural Union. It aimed at a thorough organisation of the agricultural interests represented alike by the landlords, tenants and labourers. Its programme included:

- reduction of local taxation of agricultural property
- abolition of preferential railway rates for British produce
- old-age pensions for working men
- amendment of the law relating to adulteration of food and the Merchandise Marks Acts
- amendment of the Agricultural Holdings Act
- increased facilities to enable working men to obtain small holdings

By the time of his death in 1898, most of these aims were achieved, including the reduction in railway charges by bulking shipments. To that end, he established early in 1896 British Produce Supply Association Limited with a capital of £50,000 which opened extensive stores for the sale and distribution of British produce under the Cable brand. Cable was the title of the weekly newspaper, the official organ of the National Agricultural Union. County associations of agriculturists were formed for mutual support and combination.

The National Farmers Union (at that time Lincolnshire Farmers Union) was formed in his home county of Lincolnshire in 1904, six years after his death.

=== Children's Order of Chivalry ===
In 1893 with his wife, the Countess, he founded the Children's Order of Chivalry in memory of their only son, George Edward Henry, Viscount Maidstone ("Maidy"), who had died the previous year at the age of nine. Prior to his death, the child had discussed with his father the idea of establishing the Order.

== Personal life ==
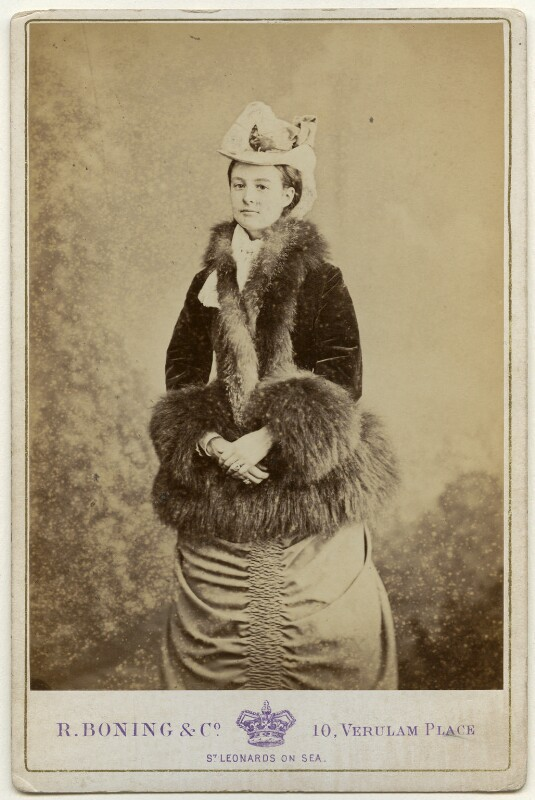
Edith Harcourt, Countess of Winchilsea

In 1875, Murray Finch-Hatton married Edith Harcourt, daughter of Edward William Harcourt and Lady Susan Harriet Holroyd, daughter of 2nd Earl of Sheffield and Lady Harriet Lascelles of Harewood house. Edith's uncle was Sir William Harcourt, while her aunt Cecilia Harcourt had married her husband's uncle Sir Edward Rice.

Together they had two children:

1. George Edward Henry Murray Finch-Hatton, Viscount Maidstone, (1883-1892), died at the age of nine.
2. Lady Muriel Finch-Hatton (1876-1938), who married Sir Richard Arthur Surtees Paget, 2nd Baronet (1869-1955) and left issue, including their grandsons Alexander Chancellor, the father of model Cecilia Chancellor, and John Paget Chancellor, who married the Hon. Mary Alice Jolliffe (daughter of William Jolliffe, 4th Baron Hylton), the parents of actress Anna Chancellor.

Finch-Hatton's country residence was at Haverholme Priory, Lincolnshire, a roomy home with turrets and battlements, inherited from his father through his uncle in law, Sir Jenison Gordon, 2nd Baronet who had married his aunt Lady Gordon. The staircase was graced by the Finches' griffin ornaments which made for imposing finials, the walls were lined by Gobelins tapestry and armour from Kirby Hall, and allegorical pictures made by his great-aunt Lady Gordon, who was a pupil of Gainsborough. In the rarely used dining room hanged actual Gainsborough paintings of the family.

He died in September 1898, aged 47. Murray was succeeded by his younger brother who became Henry Finch-Hatton, 13th Earl of Winchilsea. His estate was proved at £106,403 (equivalent to modern day £14 million)

=== Pet Lion ===
Lord Winchilsea bought a pet lion while he was touring Egypt. The lion was fed by his lordship himself and had become very tame. He brought the lion home and presented it to the Zoological society and was awarded fellowship.

=== Outdoor recreations ===
Among Lord Winchilsea's outdoor recreations were bricklaying, glazing and the digging of dykes "in which accomplishment it is said he was not surpassed by any workman in the county". In the summer of 1895, he spent nearly all his holidays repairing the roof of Ewerby church.

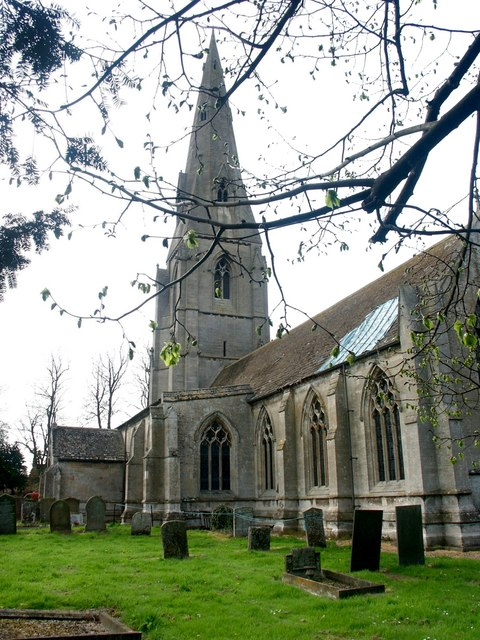
St Andrew, Ewerby tarpaulin

=== Motorist ===
Earls of Winchilsea's coat of arms. griffins (Finch), garb gules (Hatton).

He was also a great motoring enthusiast, and played a leading role at the very first London to Brighton Car Run on 14 November 1896, symbolically tearing a red flag in two to start the event, and presiding at the dinner which took place in Brighton at its conclusion.

Parliament of the United Kingdom
Preceded by Sir William Welby-Gregory; John Lawrance	Member of Parliament for Lincolnshire South; 1884 – 1885; With: John Compton Lawrance	Constituency abolished
New constituency	Member of Parliament for Spalding; 1885 – 1887	Succeeded by Halley Stewart
Peerage of England
Preceded by George James Finch-Hatton	Earl of Winchilsea; 1887–1898	Succeeded by Henry Finch-Hatton
Preceded by George James Finch-Hatton	Earl of Nottingham; 7th creation 1887–1898	Succeeded by Henry Finch-Hatton
