= John Chancellor (colonial administrator) =

British soldier and colonial administrator

Lieutenant-Colonel Sir John Chancellor GCMG, GCVO, GBE, DSO
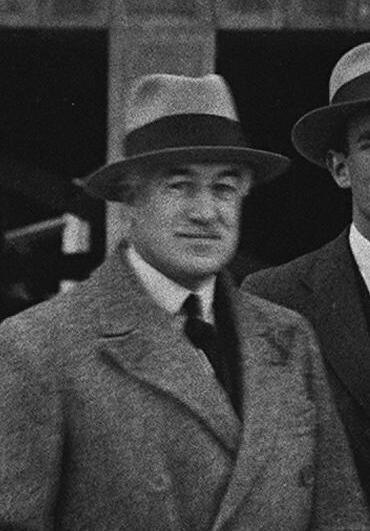
- John Chancellor in 1931
- Born: 20 October 1870; Edinburgh, Scotland
- Died: 31 July 1952 (aged 81); Lanarkshire, Scotland
- Military career
- Allegiance: United Kingdom
- Branch: British Army
- Rank: Lieutenant Colonel
- Unit: Corps of Royal Engineers
- Awards: Distinguished Service Order, Companion of the Order of St Michael and St George, Knight Commander of the Order of St Michael and St George, GBE
- Other work: Colonial Administrator

Sir John Robert Chancellor GCMG, GCVO, GBE, DSO (20 October 1870 – 31 July 1952) was a Scottish soldier, colonial administrator, and lieutenant-colonel in the British Army.

== Biography ==
Chancellor was the younger son of Edward Chancellor, of Woodhall House, Juniper Green, Midlothian, and Anne Helen Tod (d. 1932), daughter of John Robert Tod, WS. The Chancellor family had held the lands of Shieldhill, Quothquan from 1432.

He attended the Royal Military Academy Sandhurst, and after graduation was commissioned into the British Army's Corps of Royal Engineers as a second lieutenant on 25 July 1890. Promoted to lieutenant on 25 July 1893, he took part in the 1896 Dongola Expedition under Sir Herbert Kitchener, and served in the 1897–98 Tirah campaign on the North West Frontier of British India as part of the Sirmoor Imperial Service Snappers. For his service in India he was mentioned in despatches, received the India Medal, and was awarded the Distinguished Service Order (DSO) in 1898. He was promoted to captain on 20 May 1901, and later served as Secretary of the Colonial Defence Committee.

After a career in the Royal Engineers he became a colonial administrator serving as the 20th Governor of Mauritius from 13 September 1911 to 28 January 1916, Trinidad and Tobago (1916–1921) and Southern Rhodesia (1923–1928). He also served as Principal Assistant Secretary to the Committee of Imperial Defence From 1922 to 1923.

In 1898 he was awarded the Distinguished Service Order (DSO). In 1909 he was appointed a Companion of the Order of St Michael and St George. He was knighted in the 1913 King's Birthday Honours when he was made a Knight Commander of the Order of St Michael and St George (KCMG). In the 1922 Dissolution Honours List he was promoted to Knight Grand Cross of the Order of St Michael and St George (GCMG). He was appointed a Knight of Justice in the Venerable Order of Saint John on 19 December 1928.

== High Commissioner of Palestine ==
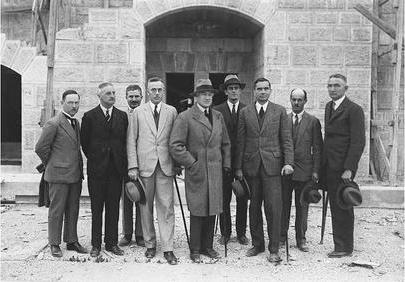
Chancellor in Palestine, 1931.

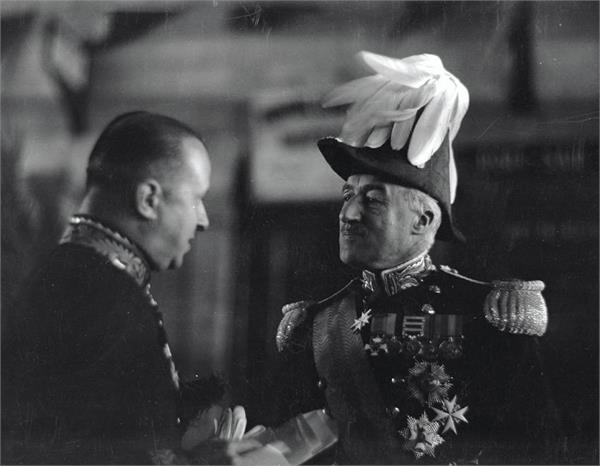
Chancellor installed as High Commissioner, 6 December 1928.

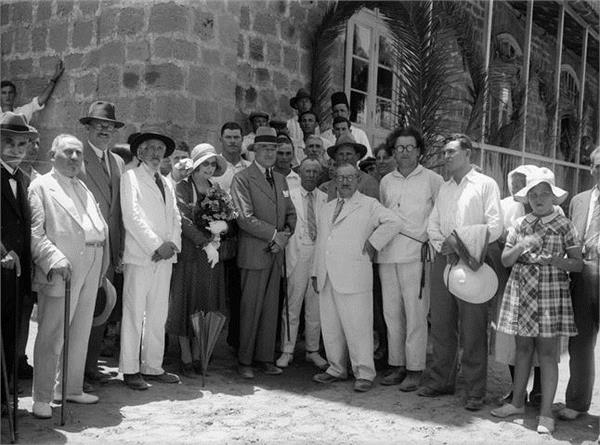
High Commissioner Chancellor visiting Rishon Lezion, 1931.

In 1928, he became High Commissioner of the British Mandate of Palestine, where he was perceived as being cool to Zionism and the Jewish people. Though he admired some Zionist leaders, in particular Pinhas Rutenberg, in general Chancellor's attitude towards Jews was negative. He wrote to his son that "truly the Jews are an ungrateful race". His attitude towards Arabs was politically supportive but paternalistic; he wrote to his son: "they are like children, and very difficult to help".

While he was in London in 1929, riots broke out in Jerusalem stemming from Muslims protesting Jews' use of the Western Wall. On his return, he initially condemned Arab attacks but was subsequently less critical. He helped write Lord Passfield's White Paper of 1930, which aimed to reinterpret the Balfour Declaration. He left Palestine in 1931.

In 1931, Jerusalem's Straus Street was renamed Chancellor Avenue in his honour. The street reverted to its original name after the 1948 Arab-Israeli War.

In 1937 he was appointed chairman of the Livestock Commission, which was set up following the passing of the Livestock Industry Act, 1937. In the 1947 King's Birthday Honours he was created a Knight Grand Cross in the Civil Division of the Order of the British Empire (GBE) for services to the Ministry of Agriculture and Fisheries.

== Family ==
In 1903, Chancellor married Mary Elizabeth Howard (1881–1976), daughter of George Rodie Thompson, DL, JP, of Lynwood, Ascot, Berkshire. They had three children: Christopher John Howard Chancellor (1904–1989), who married Sylvia Mary Paget in 1926; Robert Duff (Robin) Chancellor (1921-2010); and a daughter, Elizabeth Rosemary Alice Chancellor (1906–1971), known as Rosemary, who married Air Chief Marshall William Elliot in 1931. Christopher and Sylvia had four children: John Paget Chancellor, Teresa Chancellor (Married Peter Gatacre then John Wells), Susanna Maria Chancellor (married Nicholas Johnston) and Alexander Chancellor; Rosemary and William also had two children: Louise Elliot (Halsey) and Simon Elliot.

== Legacy ==
Chancellor Avenue in Salisbury, Southern Rhodesia, now Harare, Zimbabwe, was named after him and still bears his name. However, his grandson, Alexander Chancellor, suggested that it be changed on account of it now being the street on which Robert Mugabe, President of Zimbabwe lived. Chancellor Primary School in Mutare is also named after him. A street close to the former Governor's House (now President's House) in Port of Spain, Trinidad, is named "Lady Chancellor Road" after his wife.

Government offices
Preceded by Sir Cavendish Boyle	Governor of Mauritius; 1911–1916	Succeeded by Sir Henry Hesketh Joudou Bell
Preceded by George Le Hunte	Governor of Trinidad and Tobago; 1916–1921	Succeeded by Sir Samuel Herbert Wilson
Preceded by Percy Donald Leslie Flynn (acting administrator)	Governor of Southern Rhodesia; 1923–1928	Succeeded by Murray Bisset (acting)
Preceded by Sir Harry Charles Luke (acting)	High Commissioner of Palestine; 1928–1931	Succeeded by Sir Mark Aitchison Young (acting)
