= Jenison William Gordon =

British baronet

Sir Jenison William Gordon, 2nd Baronet (1747 – 9 May 1831 in Ewerby, Lincolnshire) succeeded his father, Sir Samuel Gordon, 1st Baronet, in 1780.

In October 1781 he married Harriet Frances Charlotte Finch (d. 1821), second daughter of the Hon. Edward Finch Hatton, who in turn was the youngest son of Daniel Finch, 7th Earl of Winchilsea and 2nd Earl of Nottingham. Debrett's, in 1815, states that Sir Jenison Gordon had his seat at Haverholm (sic) Priory, Lincolnshire.

In 1783 he served as High Sheriff of Lincolnshire. He is also listed as having served as a Deputy Lieutenant for the North Division of Kesteven in 1830.

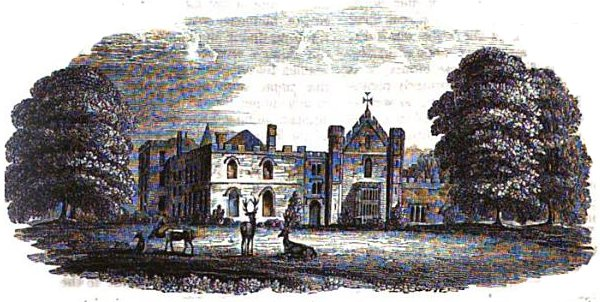
Haverholme Priory in an 1826 sketch in The Gentleman's Magazine

Jenison Gordon died at Haverholme Priory in Lincolnshire in May 1831. He and Lady Gordon (Harriet) had no children, and so the Gordon baronetcy of Newark-upon-Trent became extinct. His estates, which at the time were described by The Times as “extensive”, passed to Harriet's nephew George William Finch-Hatton, 10th Earl of Winchilsea and 5th Earl of Nottingham.

During his occupancy of Haverholme Priory, Sir Jenison had made substantial additions and improvements to the house, “and in a style corresponding to the circumstances of the place”. Lady Gordon was a pupil of Gainsborough, Sir Jenison made provision in his will that his wife's watercolour paintings were to be preserved by her nephew.

Baronetage of Great Britain
Preceded by Samuel Gordon	Baronet (of Newark-upon-Trent); 1780–1831	Extinct
