= Cecilia Chancellor =

British model

- Born: 1 September 1966 (age 60); Dorset, England
- Occupation: Model
- Father: Alexander Chancellor
- Relatives: Anna Chancellor (cousin); Edward Chancellor (cousin); Stella Tennant (second cousin)
- Modelling information
- Height: 1.80 m (5 ft 11 in)
- Hair colour: Blonde
- Eye colour: Blue
- Agency: The Model CoOp (New York); Premium Models (Paris); Models 1 (London); Mega Model Agency (Hamburg)

Cecilia Mary Chancellor (born 1 September 1966) is a British model who has worked consistently since the 1980s and has been referred to as the living embodiment of the "London Girl" by British Vogue creative director Robin Derrick in his book Vogue Model.

== Background ==
Chancellor is a direct descendant of Murray Finch-Hatton the 12th Earl of Winchilsea, the daughter of journalist Alexander Chancellor and the cousin of actress Anna Chancellor. She was also second cousin of model Stella Tennant.

== Career ==
While still a pupil at St Paul's Girls' School in Hammersmith, Cecilia Chancellor agreed to help her friend Camilla Nickerson, who would later become an influential fashion stylist, by modelling on a test shoot with photographer Perry Ogden. The resulting £75 seemed like easy money to Cecilia and she moved into professional modelling, with her career being launched through the agency Models 1. It was Steven Meisel's decision to photograph her for Italian Vogue that helped propel her to international success.

Since then, she has walked catwalks for designers from John Galliano to Prada and Comme des Garçons to Givenchy, as well as working with fashion photographers such as Mario Testino (with whom she travelled around South America for a year shooting), Irving Penn, David Sims, Patrick Demarchelier, David Bailey, Corinne Day and Paolo Roversi.

In the 1990s, she worked extensively with Helmut Lang and became synonymous with designer Marc Jacobs' 1992 grunge-influenced collection for Perry Ellis. She went on to model for Jacobs' own label, where he named a quilted leather handbag after her.

She has appeared in numerous campaigns, from Banana Republic and Barneys to Ralph Lauren and Kenzo. She has a son named Lucas, who has been photographed alongside her in campaigns for Marc Jacobs, The Gap and on the cover of British Vogue.

Nearly thirty years after starting her career as model she continues to regularly feature in the public eye, with The Sunday Times Style Magazine recently referring to her as one of the Great British Beauties. She modelled for Hermès' Autumn/Winter 2012 catwalk show and in its Le Monde d'Hermès publication. Other recent modelling credits include French Elle, American Vogue and French Vogue.
