= Alexander Chancellor =

British journalist (1940–2017)

Alexander Chancellor CBE
- Born: Alexander Surtees Chancellor; 4 January 1940; Dane End, Hertfordshire, England
- Died: 28 January 2017 (aged 77); London, England
- Education: Eton College
- Alma mater: Trinity Hall, Cambridge
- Occupation: Journalist
- Known for: Editor of The Spectator
- Children: 2, including Cecilia
- Parents: Christopher Chancellor (father); Sylvia Mary Paget (mother)
- Relatives: Alexander Waugh (son-in-law)

Alexander Surtees Chancellor, CBE (4 January 1940 – 28 January 2017) was a British journalist and editor. He was the editor of The Spectator from 1975 to 1984.

== Background ==
Alexander Chancellor was born in 1940 in Dane End, Hertfordshire, of four children born to journalist Christopher Chancellor and his wife, Sylvia (née Paget) Chancellor. He was educated at Eton College and Trinity Hall, Cambridge.

== Career ==
Chancellor began his career as a journalist with Reuters, where his father had worked. He was a correspondent in France and Italy. In 1975, he returned to Britain to become the editor of the conservative Spectator. He inherited a publication in deep financial crisis, and responded by hiring numerous new contributors, ranging from Auberon Waugh to Christopher Hitchens to Jennifer Paterson, and changing the publication's tone, with The Guardian later writing that the magazine went "from a bilious and parochial Tory weekly into an entertaining magazine". Within his first few years as editor, circulation had nearly doubled, from 12,000 to 20,000. In 1981, the magazine was sold, and Chancellor left by the middle of the decade.

In 1986, after a spell as deputy editor of The Sunday Telegraph, he became the first Washington correspondent of the newly-launched quality broadsheet, The Independent, and subsequently launched and edited the paper's first Saturday magazine. In 1993, he spent a year in the United States working as an editor at The New Yorker magazine, where he oversaw the "Talk of the Town" section. During this time, Chancellor reportedly informed his colleagues he had uncovered a great story — "a gigantic Christmas tree outside Rockefeller Center".

This experience was the basis of a memoir, Some Times in America, which both satirised the ordeal and recorded his deep affection for New York and the United States. It was published in 2000. In 1995, Chancellor returned to The Sunday Telegraph to help launch a magazine supplement. In 1996, he began writing a column for The Guardian, where he remained until January 2012. Two months later, he began to contribute to The Spectator again, with a column entitled "Long Life".

In June 2014, Chancellor became editor of The Oldie magazine in succession to Richard Ingrams.

== Personal life ==
Chancellor lived in Northamptonshire. In 1964, he married Susanna Debenham, and they had two daughters: model Cecilia Chancellor, and Eliza Chancellor, who married the writer Alexander Waugh, the son of Auberon Waugh. Chancellor was the grandson of Sir John Chancellor, the first Governor of Southern Rhodesia, and was the uncle of British actress Anna Chancellor. He was appointed a Commander of the Order of the British Empire (CBE) in the 2012 Birthday Honours for services to journalism.

Chancellor died at Chelsea and Westminster Hospital in London on 28 January 2017, aged 77. His final column for The Spectator was published on the day he died.

Media offices
Preceded by Harold Creighton	Editor of The Spectator; 1975–1984	Succeeded by Charles Moore
Preceded by ?	Deputy Editor of the Sunday Telegraph; 1986	Succeeded by Ian Watson
