= Ewerby =

Village in the North Kesteven district of Lincolnshire, England

Coordinates: 53.010752°N 0.329746°W

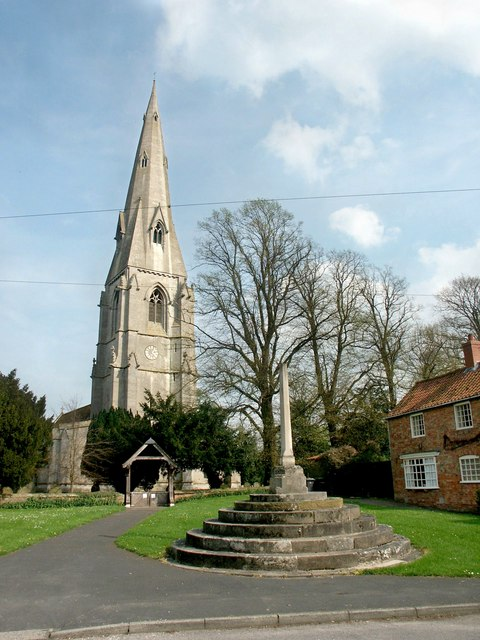
- Church of St Andrew, Ewerby

- Location within Lincolnshire
- OS grid reference: TF121472
  - London: 105 mi (169 km) S
- Civil parish: Ewerby and Evedon
- District: North Kesteven
- Shire county: Lincolnshire
- Region: East Midlands
- Country: England
- Sovereign state: United Kingdom
- Post town: Sleaford
- Postcode district: NG34
- Police: Lincolnshire
- Fire: Lincolnshire
- Ambulance: East Midlands
- UK Parliament: Sleaford and North Hykeham

Ewerby is a village in the civil parish of Ewerby and Evedon, in the North Kesteven district of Lincolnshire, England. It lies 3 miles (4.8 km) north-east from Sleaford and 2 miles (3.2 km) south from Anwick. The hamlet of Ewerby Thorpe lies 0.7 miles (1.1 km) to the east from Ewerby.

== History ==
The 'Ewerby' place name is derived from the Old Scandinavian 'Ivarr' person name, with 'by', a farmstead, village or settlement.

Ewerby is listed in the 1086 Domesday Book as "Iwarebi", with 17.5 households, 9 smallholders, 9 freemen, a priest, a church, 2 ploughlands, and a meadow of 24 acres (0.10 km^{2}), and woodland of 20 acres (0.08 km^{2}). It was in the Hundred of Aswardhurn, in Kesteven. In 1066 the Ewerby Lord of the manor was Tonni of Lusby, of Culverthorpe. Ewerby Lordship was transferred in 1086 to Gilbert of Ghent, who also became Tenant-in-chief.

In 1885 Kelly's Directory noted that Ewerby was the former market town of "Ywarby". The parish area of 2,607 acres (11 km^{2}) produced crops of wheat, beans, barley, turnips and seeds—small potatoes used as seed stock—on a soil of clay and loam. Parish population in 1881 was 451. The parish register dates from 1562. There was a National School, built by subscription in 1841, which held 140 children, and had an average attendance of 92. The school was partially supported by Murray Finch-Hatton DL JP, who was also Lord of the manor and a principal landowner. Parish occupations at the time included seven farmers, three of whom were variously a seed merchant; a proprietor of the Finch Hatton Arms hotel; and a surveyor and brick & tile maker. There was a grocer & draper, wheelwright, grazier, boot & shoe maker, and two butchers, one of whom was also a beer retailer. The post master also traded as a shopkeeper, and as the Monday post carrier to Sleaford.

Parish population had reduced to 321 in 1921, within an increased parish area of 2,917 acres (12 km^{2}), with 6 acres of water. A Methodist chapel was built in 1879. A 14th-century village cross at the centre of the village, restored in 1908, is now Grade II listed. By 1933 there was established a parish library and reading room, with 300 volumes. A charity, Rothwell's charity, established in 1875 for the provision of coal and meat for the deserving poor of the parish, had been, by 1933, suspended. An earlier charity, established in 1667, provided for the maintenance of a schoolmaster to teach poor children of Ewerby, Evedon, Howell and Asgarby, with remaining charitable income providing "grey gowns for the widows of the parish". In 1933 parish commercial occupations included nine farmers, one of whom was a poultry farmer, a smallholder, blacksmith, grazier, and the proprietor of the Finch Hatton Arms public house. There were two shopkeepers, one of whom was clerk to the parish council, and a wheelwright, who was now the Monday post carrier to Sleaford. The post office processed money orders, and acted as a telephone call centre for limited distance calls. On 1 April 1931 the parish was abolished to form "Ewerby and Evedon".

== Landmarks ==
At Ewerby are the Haverholme Priory ruins, and the Grade I listed Anglican church dedicated to St Andrew. The church is an example of early 14th century Decorated style with a 167 feet (51 metres) high spire. In the north chancel is the recumbent effigy of Sir Alexander Aunsell (d. 1360), the founder of the church. St Andrew's was restored in 1895. In late 2009 the ecclesiastical parishes of Kirkby Laythorpe and Ewerby became part of the benefice of New Sleaford, to be held in plurality.

The village public house is the Finch Hatton Arms on Main Street.
