= Haverholme Priory =

Former monastery in Lincolnshire

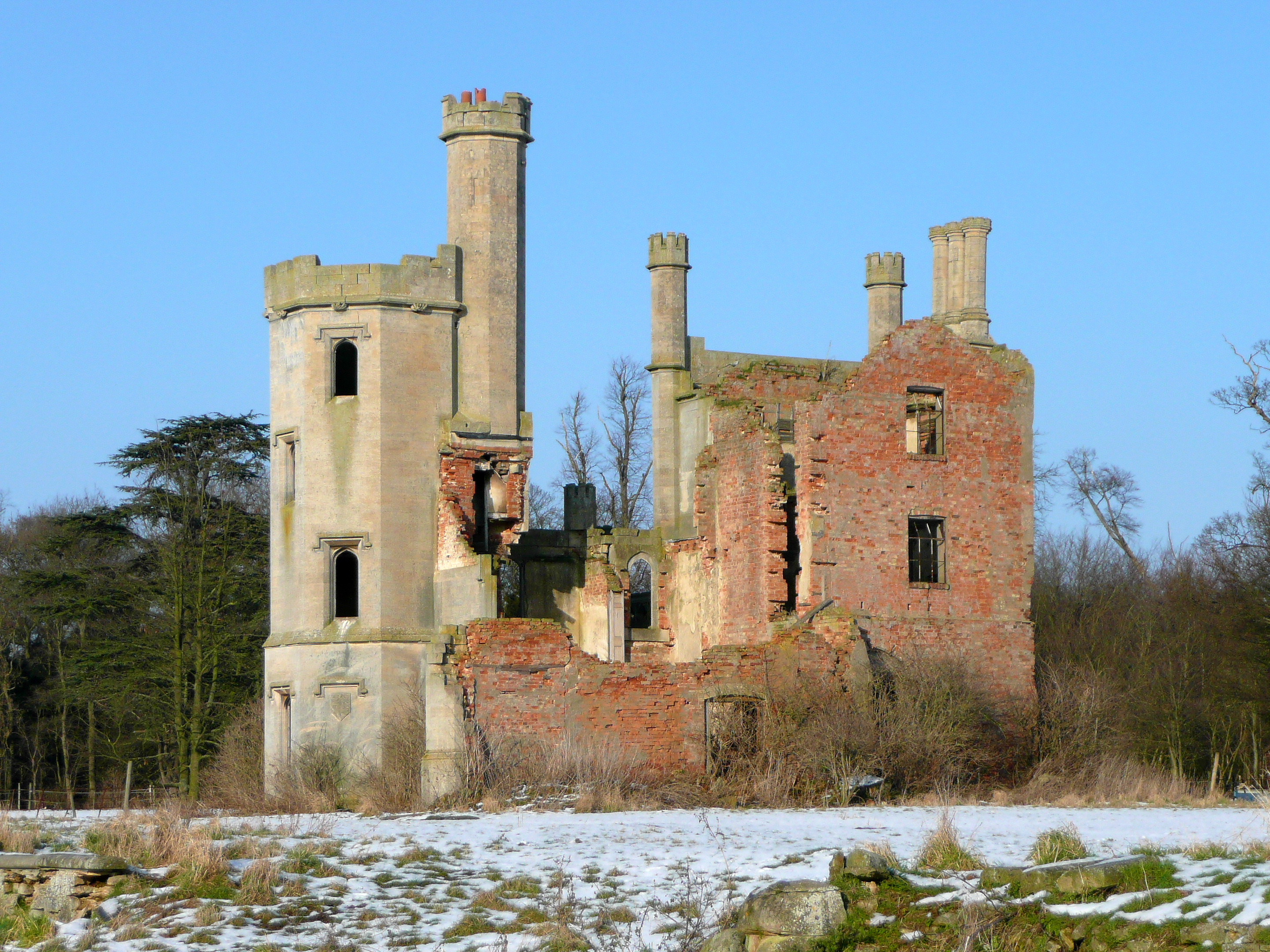
- Ruins of Haverholme Priory

- Location within Lincolnshire

Monastery information
- Order: Cistercian 1137–1139; Gilbertine 1139–1538
- Established: 1137, 1139
- Disestablished: 1538
- Dedication: St Mary

People
- Founders: Alexander, Bishop of Lincoln

Architecture
- Status: Monastery rebuilt as a house in the 1780s and 1830s, now ruined
- Heritage designation: Scheduled Monument 1004984; Grade II listed building 1360563

Site
- Location: Ewerby and Evedon, North Kesteven, Lincolnshire
- Coordinates: 53°01′51″N 0°20′57″W

Haverholme Priory was a former monastery and a country house in Lincolnshire, England. Its remains are situated 4 miles (6 km) north-east of the town of Sleaford and less than 1 mile (1.6 km) south-west from the village of Anwick.

== Foundation ==
In 1137, Alexander, Bishop of Lincoln offered the site of Haverholme Priory to the Cistercian monks of Fountains Abbey. After two years of construction, the order rejected the site and instead established Louth Park Abbey. Haverholme was offered to Gilbert of Sempringham and his Gilbertine order, who sent nuns and brothers from Sempringham to inhabit the new buildings of what was to be a double monastery.

It is rumoured that in 1164 Thomas Becket hid at Haverholme during one of his arguments with the King.

== Gilbertine operation ==
The Gilbertines also inherited the responsibility for keeping the neighbouring fens drained, and to maintain a foot ferry to Sleaford across the River Slea at Ewerby Waith. They were however summoned to account in 1316 when it fell into disrepair. They were summoned again in 1360 when Alice Everingham, daughter of John de Everingham, who was supposed to have taken vows, fled from the Priory, only to be hunted down and recaptured. She complained to the Bishop of the time that she had never taken vows and she was being held against her will, so he ordered her to be released.

== Dissolution ==
Henry VIII dissolved the Priory in 1538, which by the time the members of the Priory had dwindled down to a small number. The Priory was granted to Edward Lord Clinton, he sold it and it had various owners for over two hundred years.

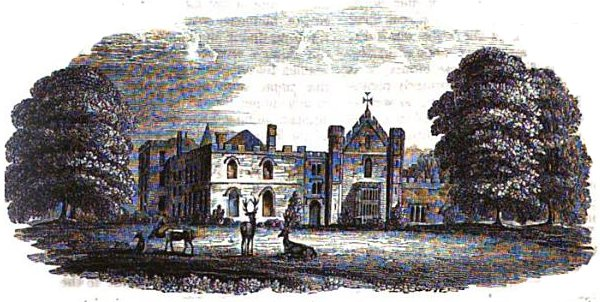
Haverholme Priory in an 1826 sketch in The Gentleman's Magazine

=== The Gordons ===
Haverholme was then bought by Sir Samuel Gordon, 1st Baronet in 1763, it passed to his son Sir Jenison William Gordon, 2nd Baronet, who in 1788 improved and enlarged it. Sir Jenison had married Harriet Finch "Lady Gordon", they often visited Eastwell Park (home of Harriet's brother) and met Jane Austen there, who made kind descriptions of the couple in 1805.

=== The Finch-Hattons ===
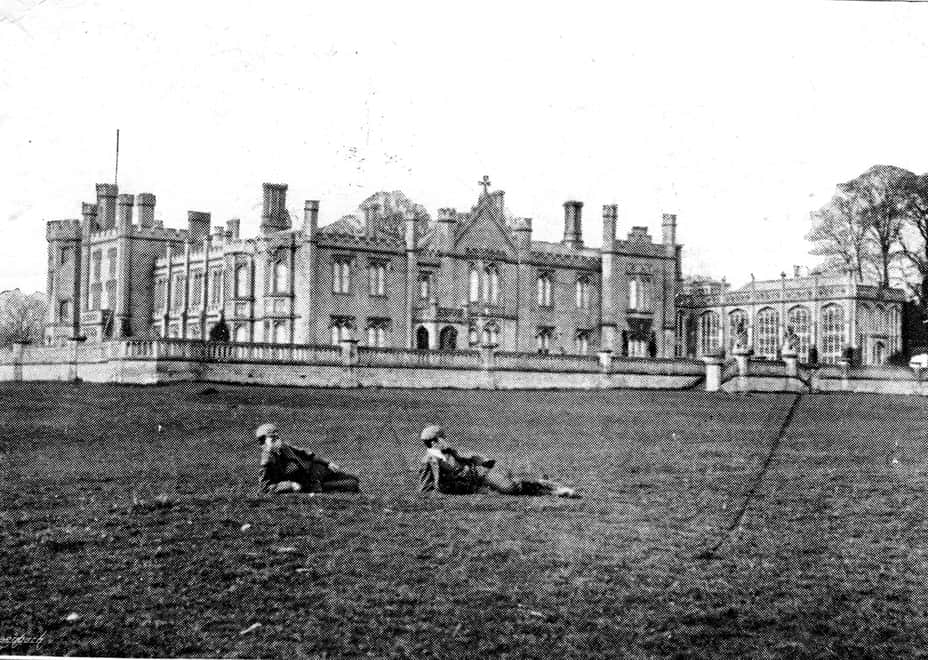
Haverholme Priory, Lincolnshire c. 1903. The boys were Denys and Guy Montagu Finch-Hatton

Sir Jenison and his wife had no issue, so when Sir Jenison died in 1831, he left Haverholme to his wife's nephew, George Finch-Hatton, 10th Earl of Winchilsea, because of high costs and Sir Jenison's provision in the will for him to live here, he decided to abandon one of his estate of Kirby Hall for Haverholme.

The 10th Earl of Winchilsea then commissioned Henry Edward Kendall to redesign Haverholme in 1830s, the work being completed in 1835. A resemblance to Haverholme Priory can be seen in Carre's Hospital at Sleaford, designed also by Kendall.

The 10th Earl died in 1858, he left his main estates of Eastwell Park and Kirby Hall to his eldest son George Finch-Hatton, 11th Earl, and Haverholme estate to his second son Murray Gordon Finch-Hatton, later the 12th Earl of Winchilsea, who was only 7 when he inherited and then raised here by his mother Fanny, now Dowager Countess of Winchilsea (great-niece of Jane Austen, from her brother Edward Austen Knight), who frequently invited her Austen relatives to the house. The 12th Earl later sold the ancestral Eastwell to pay off the huge inherited debt from his half-brother the 11th Earl in 1894, but kept Haverholme as his seat, he wished to restore the abandoned Kirby Hall, but he died in 1898 before he could realize his dream.

Without a male heir, Haverholme then passed to the 12th Earl's younger brother, Henry Finch-Hatton, 13th Earl of Winchilsea, father of Denys Finch-Hatton and the Guy Finch-Hatton, 14th Earl. The exterior of Haverholme at this time was decorated with turrets and battlements, the staircase was graced by Finches griffin which made for imposing finials, the walls were lined by Gobelins tapestry and armour from Kirby Hall, and allegorical pictures made by his great-aunt Lady Gordon, who was a pupil of Gainsborough. In the rarely used dining room hung actual Gainsborough paintings of the family.

== Demolition ==
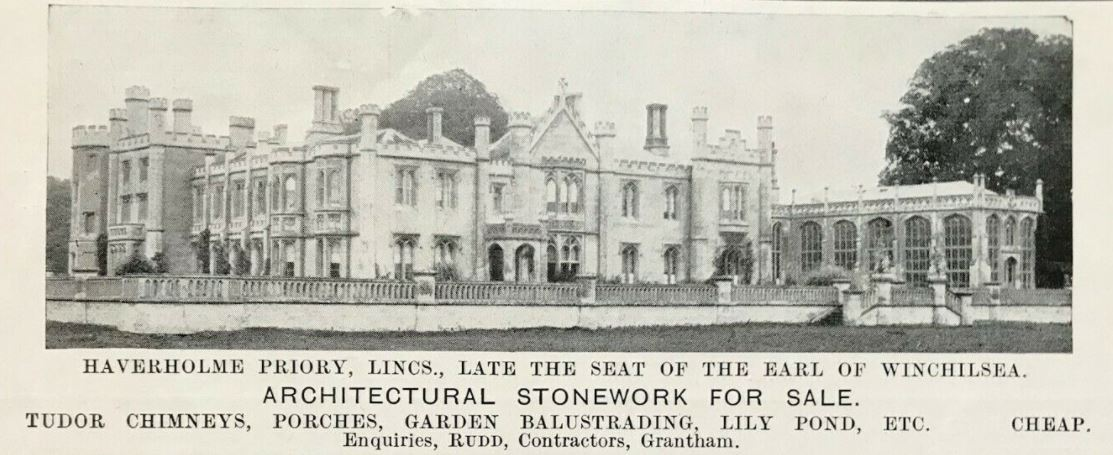
Demolition contractor flier

By the early 1910s the Finch Hatton family had fallen on hard times. The 13th Earl's eldest son and heir, Guy Finch-Hatton, Viscount Maidstone then sought and in 1910 married a rich American Heiress, Margaretta Drexel, whose grandfather was said to have a net worth of $40 million (modern day $1.5 billion), but the couple instead decided to purchase another country estate named Buckfield House in 1926. Thus his father the 13th Earl decided to sell the Haverholme estate in 1926.

The priory and its land was then up for sale. It did not attract any buyers who wanted to live there. Eventually it did sell to the demolition company RUDD of Grantham. Most of the stone structure of Haverholme was sold in 1926 by RUDD to an American woman who planned to reassemble it in America. The cargo of stonework was on a dock in Liverpool when the buyer became a victim in a train crash. Eventually the stones, never shipped to America, were used to build new docks.

== Present Ruin ==
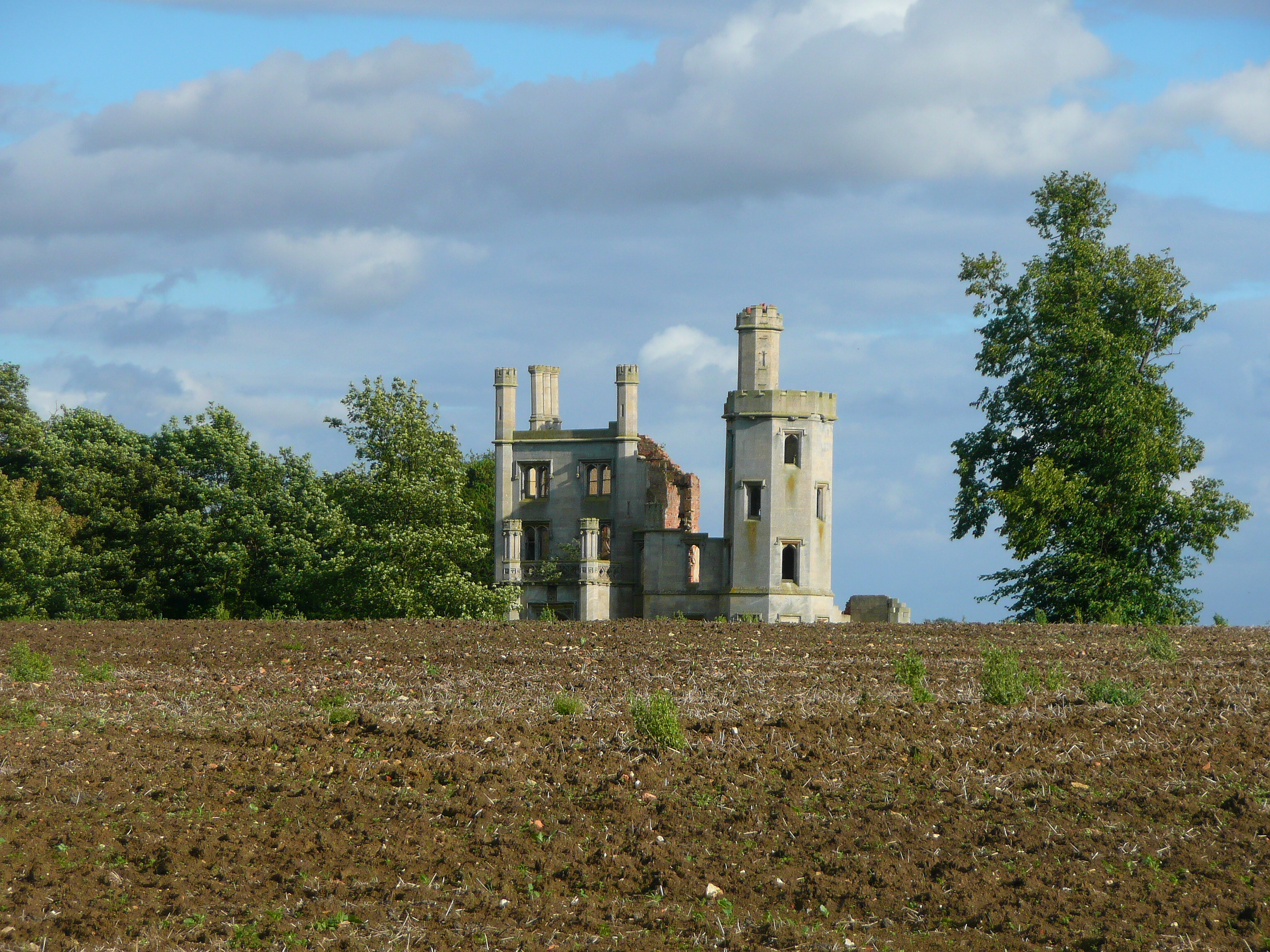
Haverholme Priory today

The present ruin is the remains of a Gothic building built around 1835 to designs by the architect Henry Edward Kendall. This was a rebuild of an earlier house dating from 1780. The ruins are now a Grade II listed building and designated Ancient Monument.
