= Daniel Heneage Finch-Hatton =

The Honourable Reverend Daniel Finch-Hatton
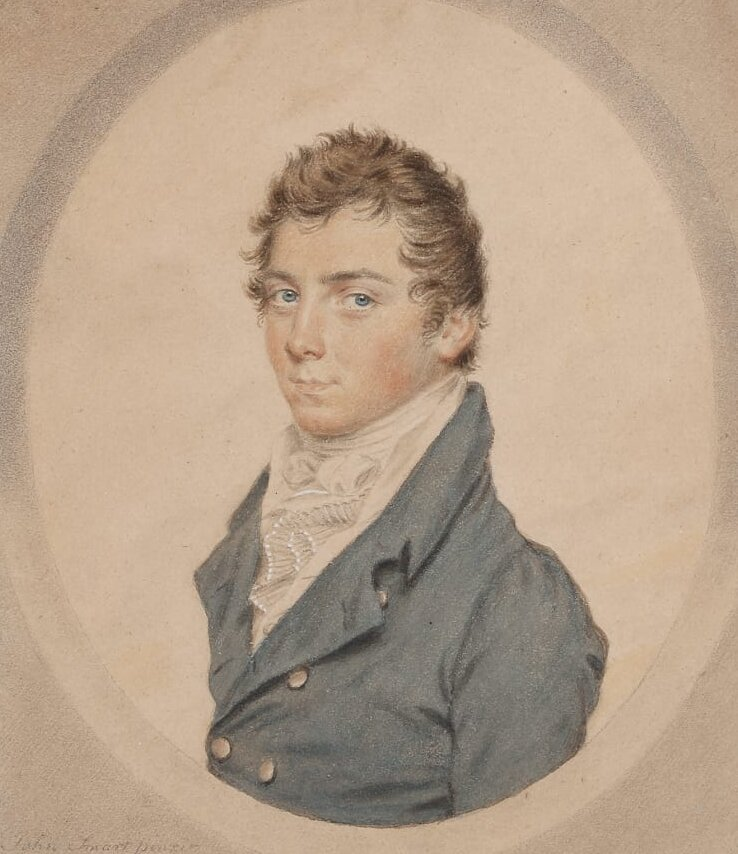
- Miniature of Daniel (or his older brother George William), by John Smart, c. 1811
- Born: Daniel Heneage Finch-Hatton; 5 May 1795; Eastwell Park
- Died: 3 January 1866 (aged 70)
- Education: Westminster School
- Alma mater: Christ's College, Cambridge
- Spouse: Lady Louisa Greville (m. 1825; died 1866)
- Parent(s): George Finch-Hatton; Lady Elizabeth Murray
- Relatives: George Finch-Hatton, 10th Earl of Winchilsea (brother); David Murray, 2nd Earl of Mansfield (grandfather); Hon. Edward Finch-Hatton (grandfather)

The Honourable and Reverend Daniel Heneage Finch-Hatton (5 May 1795 – 3 January 1866), was a Chaplain in Ordinary to Queen Victoria and Rector of Weldon, Northamptonshire.

== Early life ==
The combined coat of arms of the Finch-Hattons.

Finch-Hatton was born at Eastwell Park on 5 May 1795. He was the third son of George Finch-Hatton, MP for Rochester, and Lady Elizabeth Murray, daughter of David Murray, 2nd Earl of Mansfield. His grandfather was the Hon. Edward Finch-Hatton, youngest son of Daniel Finch, 7th Earl of Winchilsea and Anne Hatton. His eldest brother was George William Finch-Hatton, later 10th Earl of Winchilsea. Later in 1841, Queen Victoria granted all his siblings the style and precedence of the son/daughter of an earl by royal warrant, as if their father had outlived his first cousin and became Earl of Winchilsea.

Jane Austen visited Eastwell in 1805 and said, "George (his brother) is a fine boy, and well behaved, but Daniel (then 10 y.o) chiefly delighted me; the good humour of his countenance is quite bewitching. After tea we had a cribbage-table, and he and I won two rubbers of his brother and Mrs. Mary (Finch, his aunt), Mr. Brett was the only person there, besides our two families."

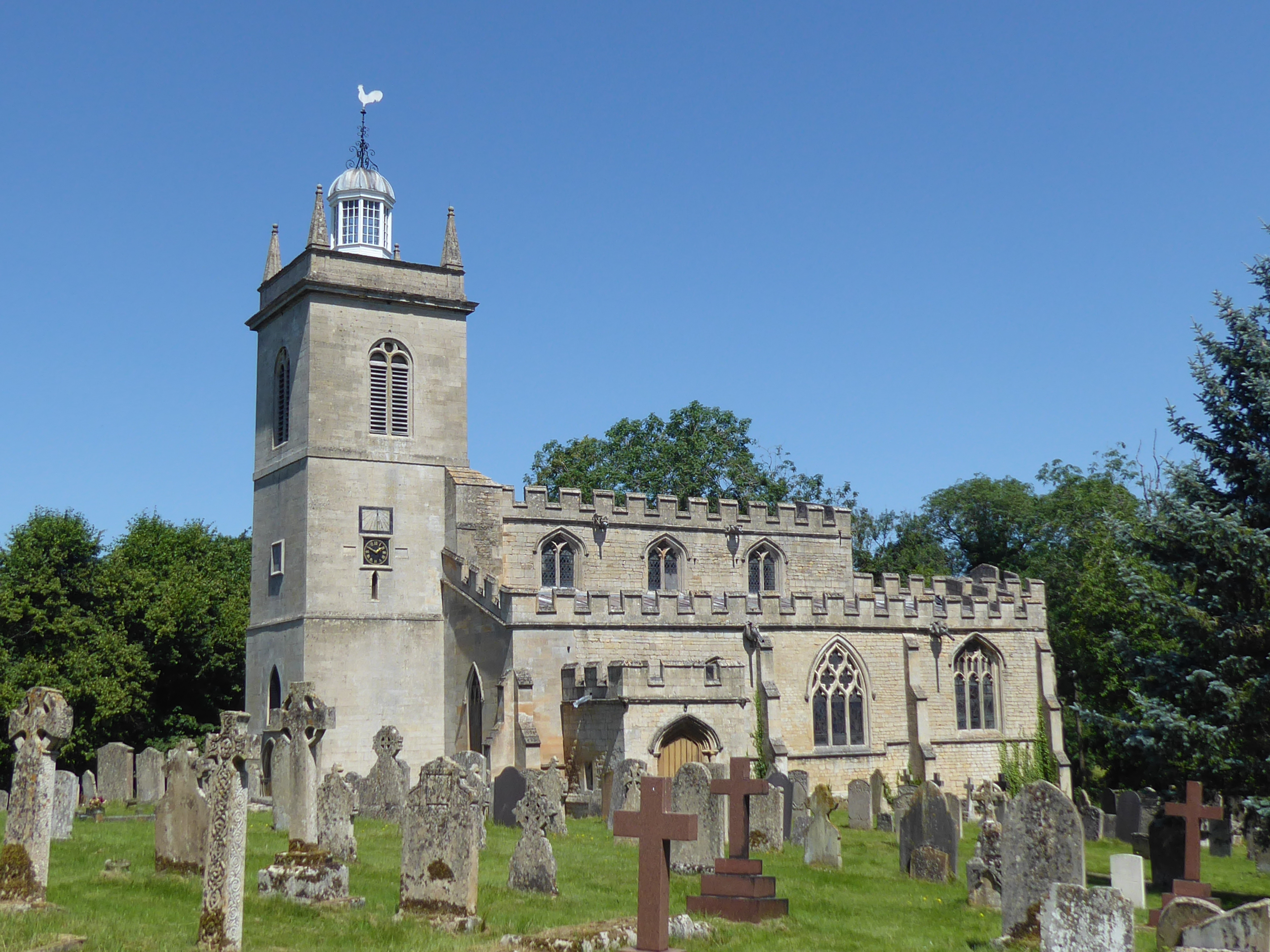
St Mary Church, Weldon, Northamptonshire. Later his son rev. William would donate a stain glass gifted from Lord Nelson to his great uncle Sir William Hamilton.

He was educated at Westminster and Christ's College, earning a Bachelor of Arts in 1818 and a Master of Arts in 1821.

== Career ==
Finch-Hatton was ordained as a Reverend into the Church of England and in 1823 was appointed Rector of Great Weldon, Northampthonshire, where his family owned Kirby Hall and some lands there. The living provided £430 a year.

=== Inheritance ===
Finch-Hatton inherited some money and silverware from his mother Lady Elizabeth when she died in June 1825. She had previously devised her fortune among her 5 younger children equally. He inherited about £2,500 and her stocks of £10,000 invested in 3 percent, her father the 2nd Earl further left his grandchildren £3,000 each. Previously when his father died, he also left him in his will £10,000.

When his uncle John Emilius Daniel Edward Finch-Hatton died in 1841 at Sandhurst Rectory, Kent (home of his sister Lady Emily), he left £500 to Daniel and £1,500 bank stock to his wife Lady Louisa. He also left their children £3,000 bank stock. He received in total about £30,000.

=== Hatton Baronets ===
In 1840s, Finch-Hatton was also made heir to their very distant relative of the Hatton Baronets. The 10th Baronet having died without issue in 1812 and left his sisters co-heiresses, the unmarried sisters passed the estates down to the surviving sisters successively until Elizabeth Ann Hatton, who died in 1845. Daniel then inherited from them the Hatton Longstanton estates. His estates in Cambridgeshire generated about £4,000 a year.

Hatton become Lord of the manor in Willingham in the county of Cambridge in 1846.

== Personal life ==
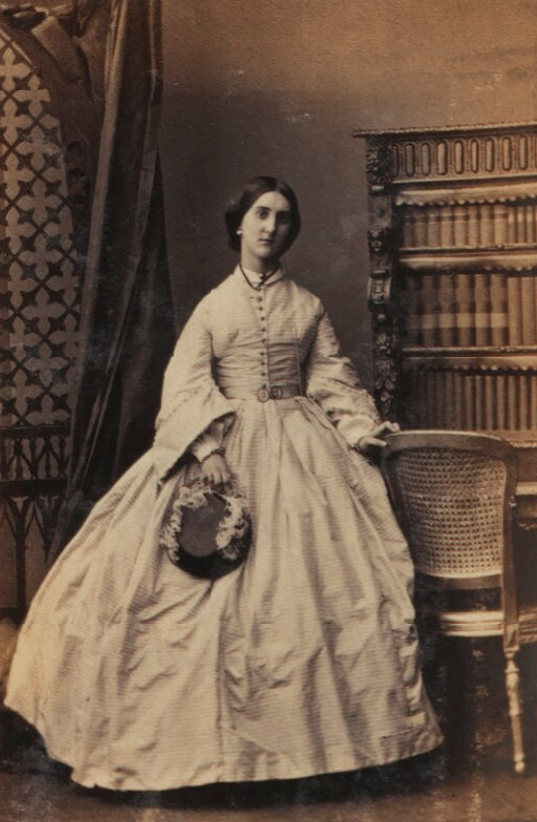
Photograph of his daughter, Isabella, by Camille Silvy, 1861

On 15 December 1825, Finch-Hatton married Lady Louisa Greville (1800–1883), daughter of Louisa Murray, 2nd Countess of Mansfield (who was previously his mother's stepmother), and her second husband, Hon. Robert Fulke Greville (third son of the 1st Earl of Warwick). Together, they were the parents of:

- Edward Hatton Finch-Hatton (1826–1887), who died unmarried.
- William Robert Finch-Hatton (1827–1909), also a Reverend; he married Agnes Graham Oxenden, a daughter of the Rev. Montagu Oxenden (younger son of Sir Henry Oxenden, Bt) and Elizabeth Wilson, and sister to Sir Percy.
- Isabella Finch-Hatton (1845–1927), who married Sir Percy Dixwell-Oxenden, 10th Baronet of Broome Park.

In 1831, Lord Winchilsea presented his brother at court of St James's Palace to King William IV, on being appointed Chaplain-in-Ordinary to his majesty.

In 1844, his distant cousin the 2nd Marquess of Exeter invited him and his niece Lady Caroline, alongside their spouses, to a banquet of limited sets at Burghley House during Queen Victoria and Prince Albert's royal visit there.

He has interest in his great-grandmother Anne Hatton's story, in which she and her father were saved after an explosion in the castle, he also created a copy of it titled "Lord Hatton's account of Castle Cornet" (poetry). The original believed to be lost, but it was discovered that Daniel had made a duplicate of the original, which was later published in 1873.

He died aged 70 at Turquay, Devon and was buried at Weldon.

=== Descendants ===
Through his son William, he was a grandfather of Ethel Beatrice Finch-Hatton, who married Brig.-Gen. Sir Charles Gunning, 7th Baronet.

== Ancestry ==
Ancestors of Daniel Heneage Finch-Hatton

8. Daniel Finch, 7th Earl of Winchilsea
4. Hon. Edward Finch-Hatton
9. Hon. Anne Hatton
2. George Finch-Hatton
10. Sir Thomas Palmer, 4th Baronet, of Wingham
5. Anne Palmer
11. Elizabeth Marsham
Daniel Heneage Finch-Hatton
12. David Murray, 6th Viscount of Stormont
6. David Murray, 2nd Earl of Mansfield
13. Anne Stewart
3. Lady Elizabeth Murray
14. Imperial Count Heinrich von Bünau
7. Imperial Countess Henrietta von Bünau
