= George Finch-Hatton (MP for Rochester) =

English politician

George Finch-Hatton FRS MP
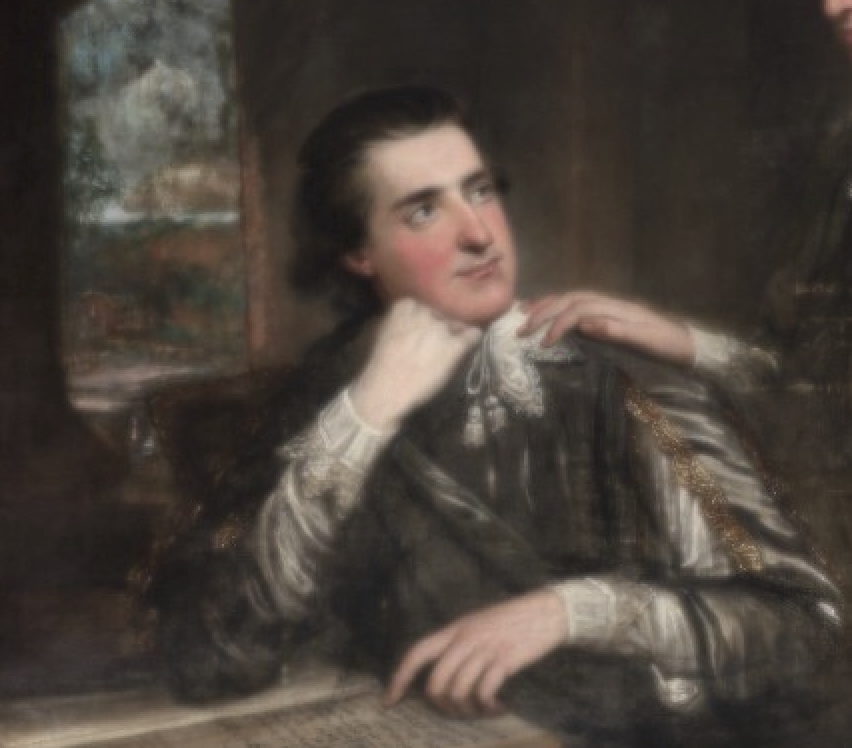
- Born: George Finch; 30 June 1747
- Died: 17 February 1823 (aged 75); Eastwell Park
- Education: Westminster School; Christ's College, Cambridge (MA, 1768)
- Occupation: Politician
- Spouse: Lady Elizabeth Murray (m. 1785)
- Children: 7, Louisa Anne Finch-Hatton; George Finch-Hatton, 10th Earl of Winchilsea; Rev. Daniel Heneage Finch-Hatton
- Parents: Edward Finch-Hatton (father); Anne Palmer (mother)
- Relatives: Anne Hatton (Grandmother); Daniel Finch, 7th Earl of Winchilsea (Grandfather)

Coat of Arms

George Finch-Hatton, Esq. FRS MP (30 June 1747 – 17 February 1823) was an English aristocrat and politician who sat in the House of Commons from 1772 to 1784. The owner of Hatton Garden in London.

== Early life ==
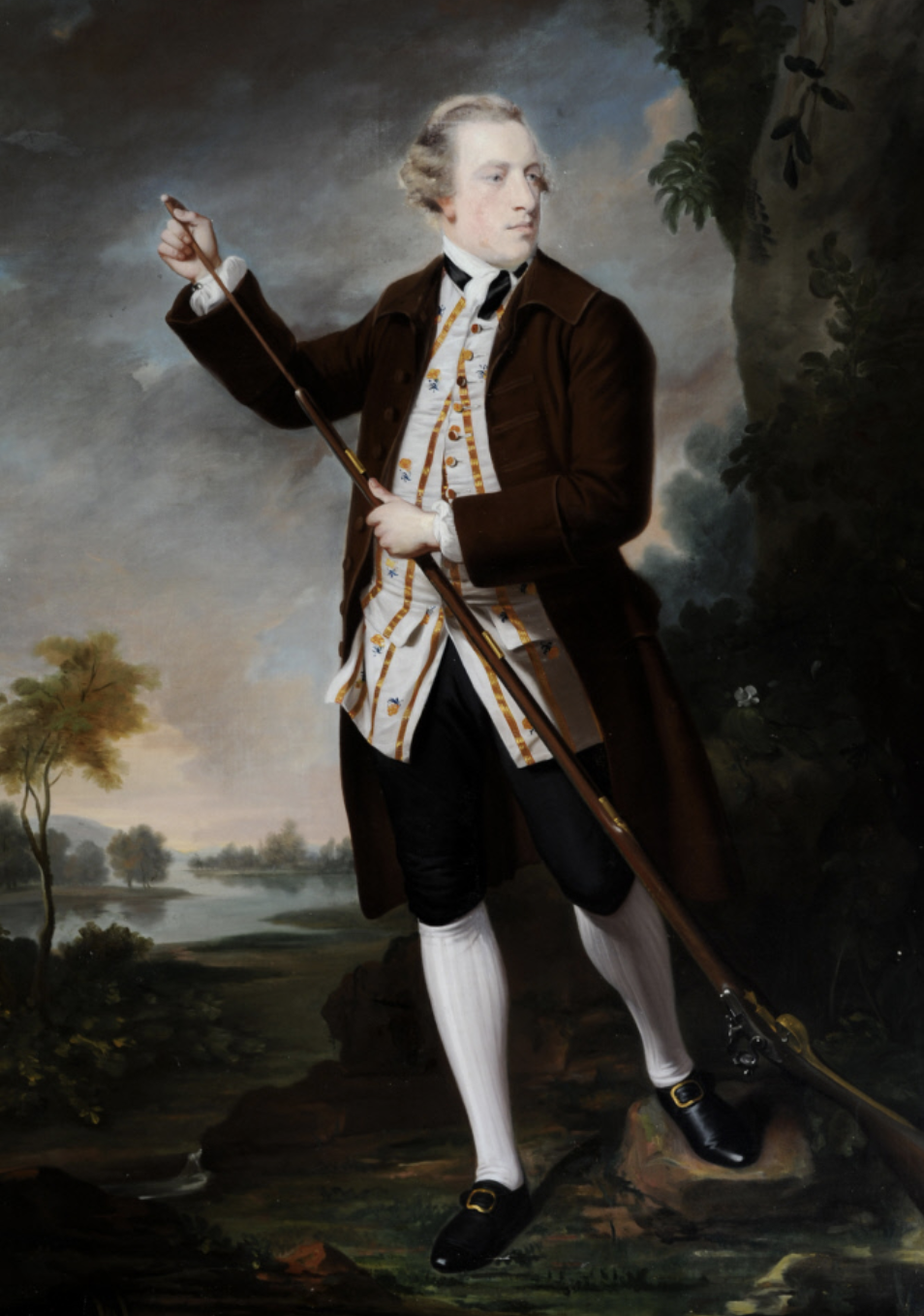
Hon. Edward Finch-Hatton (1697-1771) by Nathaniel Hone the Elder.

George Finch was born on 30 June 1747, the son of Hon. Edward Finch, youngest son of Daniel Finch, 7th Earl of Winchilsea and 2nd Earl of Nottingham and Anne Hatton. His mother was Anne Palmer, daughter and co-heiress of Sir Thomas Palmer, 4th Baronet, of Wingham. (Edward's brother, Daniel Finch, 8th Earl of Winchilsea, was married to Anne's sister, Mary Palmer, Countess of Winchilsea).

George was educated at Westminster School and at Christ's College, Cambridge, being awarded a Master of Arts degree in 1768.

He assumed the additional surname of Hatton (his grandmother's name) together with his father in 1764 on inheriting the Hatton estates. He further succeeded his uncle Daniel Finch, 8th Earl of Winchilsea to Eastwell Park and various Kentish properties in 1769 and to his father Kirby Hall, Northamptonshire in 1771.

George Finch-Hatton was the heir presumptive to his unmarried first cousin also named George Finch, 9th Earl of Winchilsea. Their fathers, Edward Finch and William Finch were brothers.

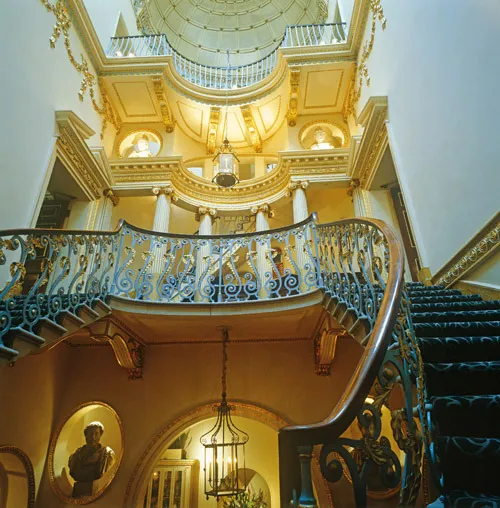
44 Berkeley Square, home of Lady Isabella Finch unaltered throughout the centuries by William Kent.

He also inherited 44 Berkeley Square (now Clermont Club), his aunt Lady Isabella Finch's incredible London home, which somehow went to his father Edward, in turned went to him since his father only survive his sister by a few months. In 1774, George sold it to Lord Clermont, an acquaintance of his late aunt and Princess Amelia, hence the house was again visited by Princess Amelia.

In the same year 1774, George now had surplus from the sale of the house, commissioned Robert Adam to rebuild Eastwell Park, but each of the designs were declined and eventually went on hold.

He eventually rebuilt the house at Eastwell between 1793 and 1800 to designs by Robert Adam's former draughtsman Joseph Bonomi in Neo-classical style.

George also inherited the Hatton Garden estate in London. He sold it in 1780s and had received around £100,000 (equivalent to £20 million) and was to receive even more money as it sold further.

George had an estimated income of £20,000 a year.

== Career ==
Finch-Hatton was elected Member of Parliament for Rochester at a by-election in 1772. He was re-elected to Rochester in contests in 1774 and 1780 (Francis Austen, uncle to Jane Austen also persuaded the 3rd Duke of Dorset to vote for Finch-Hatton), he was later defeated at the 1784 general election and didn't stand as candidate again.

Finch-Hatton was elected a Fellow of the Royal Society in 1776.

In August 1805, now known as Col George Hatton commanded East Kent regiment of volunteers to be inspected at Eastwell Park, when the regiment had a very elegant pair of colours (flags) presented to them by his wife Lady Elizabeth. They afterwards attended divine service at Eastwell church, where the colours were consecrated.

In 1809 he was commissioned as Lieutenant-Colonel Commandant of the Ashford Regiment of Local Militia (later the 1st East Kent or Ashford, Oldcastle and Elham Regiment).

In May 1812, he attended royal court at Carlton House and was presented to the Prince Regent as Lieutenant-Colonel Finch-Hatton, 1st East Kent local militia.

== Family ==
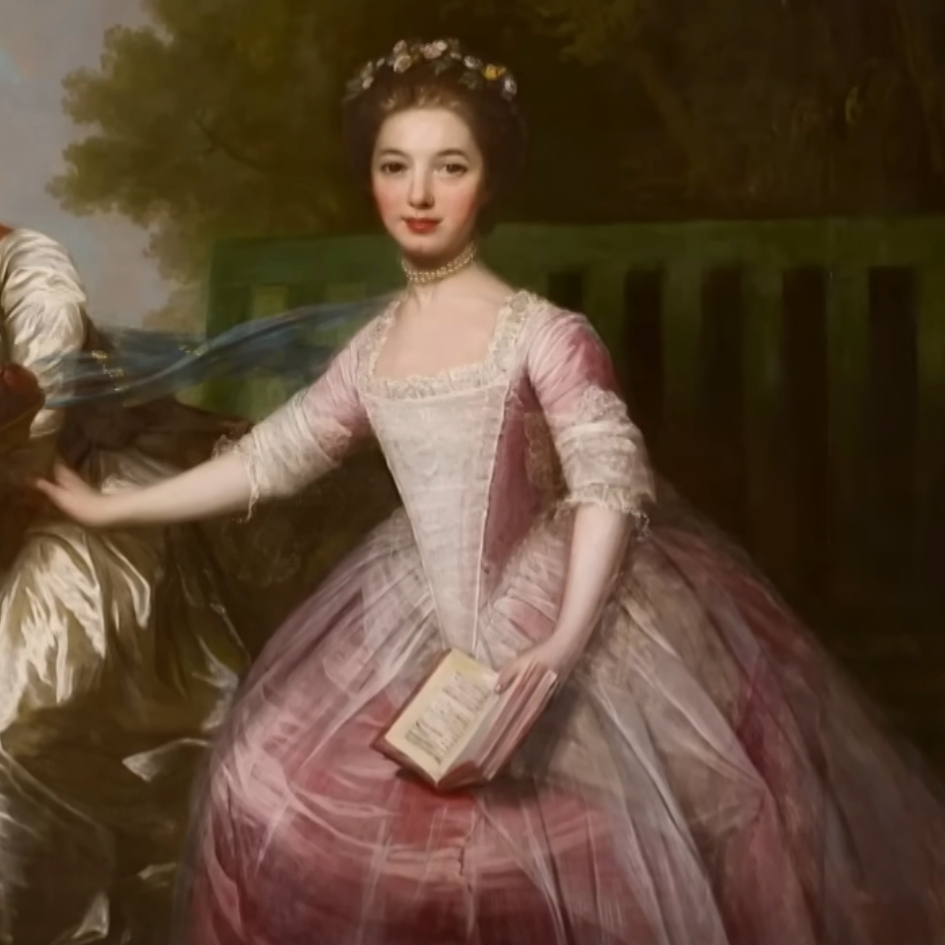
Lady Elizabeth by David Martin

Finch-Hatton married Lady Elizabeth Murray in 1785, daughter of David Murray, 2nd Earl of Mansfield and Countess Henrietta von Bünau. He was 'very much attached' to Lady Elizabeth. George owned two vast estates at Eastwell Park (Kent) and Kirby Hall (Northamptonshire). After the wedding, they went on to live at Kirby Hall and sometimes at Eastwell old manor for ten years until 1795, when they moved entirely to their newly rebuilt Eastwell Park mansion by Bonomi.

Horace Walpole remarked in 1786 that Finch-Hatton has "the true patina of the Finches" and that he supported his decision to renovate Kirby and lived in these ancient palace in a letter to his friend, Countess Ossory.

Their marriage was happy, there are a number of comments about her in letters (three at Kenwood) indicating that she was a charming and well-liked girl. His mother described Elizabeth as "Delightful".

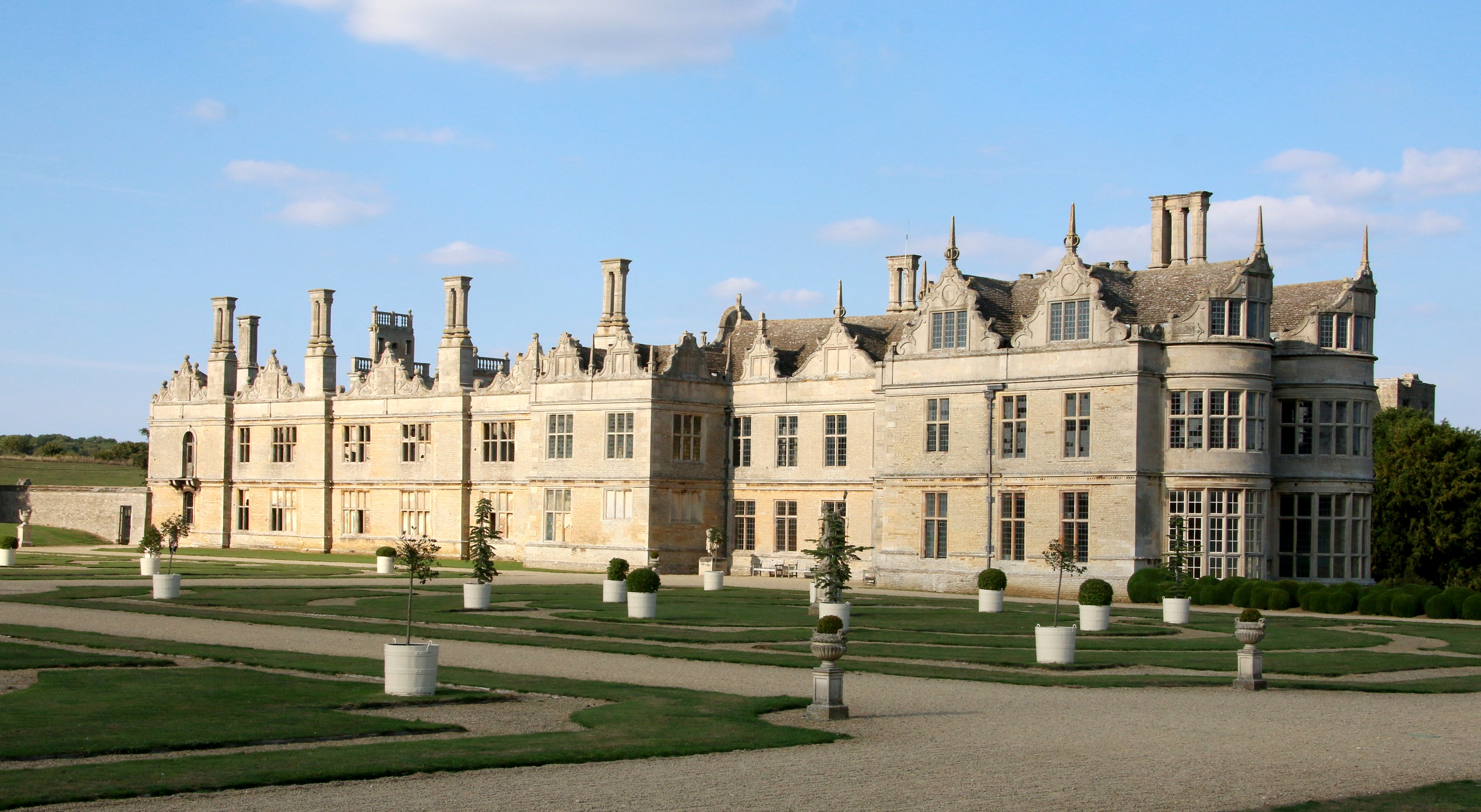
Kirby Hall, Corby, Northamptonshire.

George and Lady Elizabeth had 7 children :

1. Lady Louisa Anne m. Hon. Charles Hope, son of 2nd Earl of Hopetoun.
2. Anna Maria (d.1837)
3. Elizabeth Henrietta (d.1820)
4. George Finch-Hatton, 10th Earl of Winchilsea, m. 1814 to Lady Charlotte, daughter of 3rd Duke of Montrose, had issue 11th Earl of Winchilsea.
5. Edward Frederick, Lieut.(d.1813)
6. Hon. Rev. Daniel Heneage m. Lady Louisa Greville, daughter of 2nd Countess of Mansfield. Later made heir to the Hatton Baronets estates.
7. Lady Emily Mary m. Alfred Charnley Lawrence, had issue.

Later in 1841, Queen Victoria granted all George and Elizabeth's children the style and precedence of the son/daughter of an earl by royal warrant, as if George had outlived his first cousin and became Earl of Winchilsea.

=== Personal life ===
From the local newspapers of the day, George was very involved in the daily running of his estates and looking after the welfare of his tenants. He was regarded as a generous and kind landlord; he significantly reduced the rents of his tenants during difficult seasons and allowed the tenants to always keep half a year's rent in their hands for emergency funds.

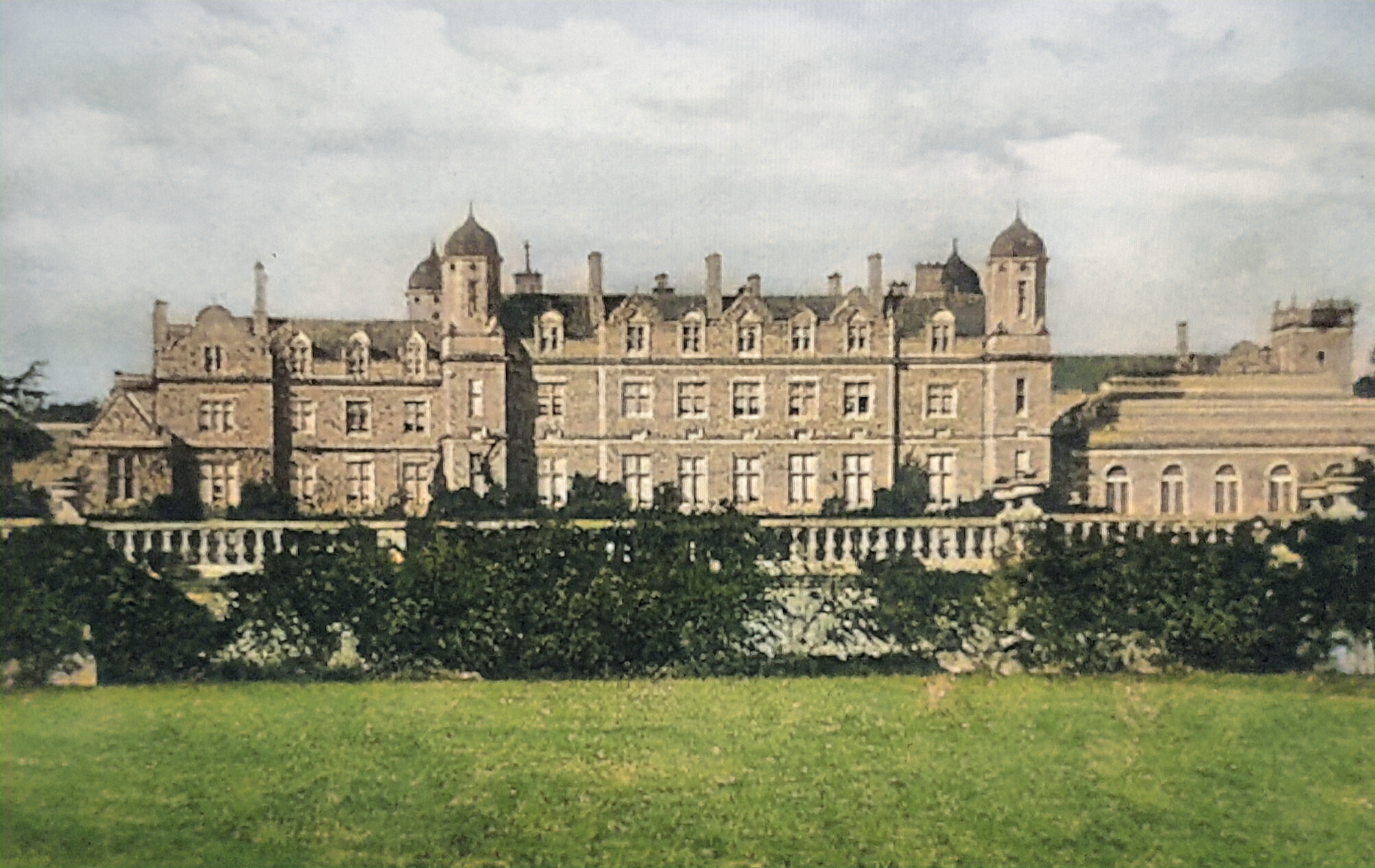
Eastwell Park, Ashford, Kent

George also enjoyed reading as he was described as 'well versed' in science and literature, the new large library at Eastwell Park was said to resemble Duncombe Park morning room with its imposing marble columns and it was noted to contain an 'excellent large collection of old books'.

In March 1805, the 3rd Earl of Mansfield invited his sister Lady Elizabeth and George to attend a grand dinner at Mansfield House in Portland Place, with his royal highness Prince Adolphus, Marquess of Bath, Lord Grantham, Marchioness of Downshire, Lord Somerville, and other distinguished guests.

Jane Austen visited George and Lady Elizabeth at Eastwell Park numerous times, they were neighbors as Jane's older brother, Edward resided at Godmersham four miles away. George was also 1st cousin once removed to Elizabeth Bridges, wife of Edward Austen Knight. In her letters to her sister Cassandra in August 1805, Austen described the family at Eastwell and she seemed to have feelings for George's younger brother, Edward Finch-Hatton.

"Eastwell was very agreeable; I found Ly. Gordon’s manners as pleasing as they had been described, and saw nothing to dislike in Sir Janison. . . [The Misses Finch] were very civil to me, as they always are; fortune was also very civil to me in placing Mr E. Hatton by me at dinner."

Jane found Lady Elizabeth rather quiet and reserved for someone of her high rank."I have discovered that Lady Elizabeth, for a woman of her age and situation, has astonishingly little to say for, and that Miss Hatton has not much more." instead Jane was in awe by Elizabeth's music skill praising "but her eloquence lies in her fingers; they were most fluently harmonious."

"George is a fine boy, and well behaved, but Daniel chiefly delighted me; the good humour of his countenance is quite bewitching. After tea we had a cribbage-table, and he and I won two rubbers of his brother and Mrs. Mary, Mr. Brett was the only person there, besides our two families." from the same 1805 Austen letter.

The Finch-Hattons were very sociable, frequently attending prestigious balls and events. In 1821, they attended the Duchess of Montrose's ball in Grosvenor Square and the farewell ball of the Duchess of Frías at the Spanish embassy. They were also entertained at Northumberland House in 1819 by the Duchess of Northumberland, with whom they were related through their son's marriage. In 1816, his daughters were invited to Queen Charlotte's ball for Princess Charlotte and Prince Leopold, they were noted to be lavishly and tastefully dressed in white satin.

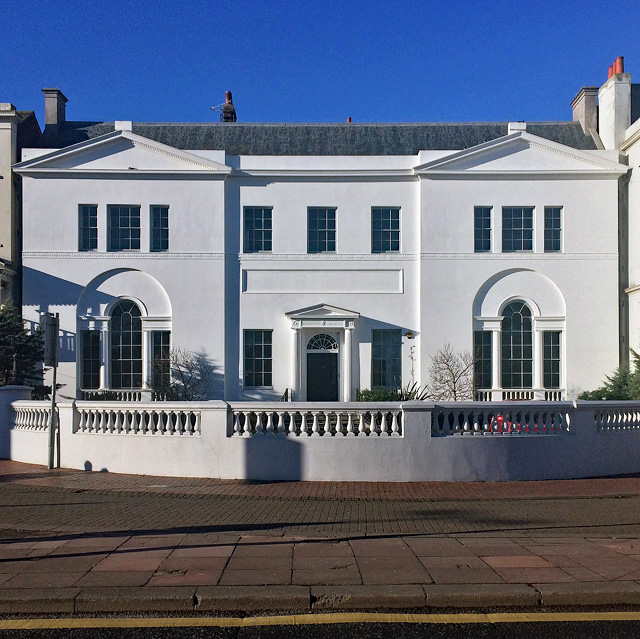
Marlborough House located next to Mrs. Fitzherbert Steine House (Mistress of King George IV) in Brighton.

In July 1817, Lady Anne Murray passed away and his wife inherited her aunt's estate including Marlborough House in Brighton, they decided to sell the house and the interested buyer was Prince Leopold, for Princess Charlotte to spend some time in after birthing, but as she died during negotiations, it did not proceed. Instead it was sold to Thomas Harrington for £9500.

=== Death ===
Finch-Hatton died in February 1823 at the age of 75 at Eastwell Park surrounded by "his tenderly attached and afflicted family". His wife died in June 1825, aged 65.

Their eldest son George William Finch-Hatton succeeded in the Earldoms of Winchilsea and Nottingham in 1826.

== Ancestry ==
Ancestors of George Finch-Hatton

8. Heneage Finch, 1st Earl of Nottingham
4. Daniel Finch, 7th Earl of Winchilsea
9. Elizabeth Harvey
2. Hon. Edward Finch-Hatton
10. Christopher Hatton, 1st Viscount Hatton
5. Hon. Anne Hatton
11. Lady Cecily Tufton
1. George Finch-Hatton
12. Herbert Palmer
6. Sir Thomas Palmer, 4th Baronet, of Wingham
13. Dorothy Pincheon
3. Anne Palmer
14. Sir Robert Marsham, 4th Baronet
7. Elizabeth Marsham
15. Margaret Bosvile

Coat of arms of Finch: Argent, a chevron between three griffins passant sable

Parliament of Great Britain
Preceded by John Calcraft; Thomas Pye	Member of Parliament for Rochester; 1772–1784; With: Thomas Pye; Robert Gregory	Succeeded by Sir Charles Middleton, Bt; Nathaniel Smith
