= John Emilius Daniel Edward Finch-Hatton =

British barrister-at-law

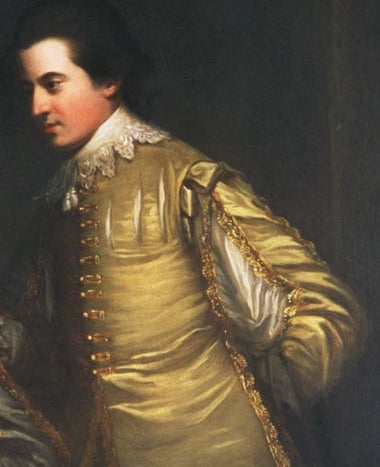
John Emilius Edward Finch-Hatton in Van Dyke inspired clothing showing antiquarian interest by David Martin. C. 1770s.

John Emilius Daniel Edward Finch-Hatton (born 19 May 1755, d. Jan 1841) was a barrister-at-law and Bencher of the Inner Temple, London.

== Life ==
Finch was the second son of Hon. Edward Finch and Anne Palmer. His father was the youngest son of Daniel Finch, 2nd Earl of Nottingham and 7th Earl of Winchilsea and Hon. Anne Hatton. Later, in 1764, he and his brother George and their father all took on the additional name of Hatton.

His name was usually shorten to Edward Finch-Hatton in the newspaper of the day and by his acquaintances. Out of 5 siblings, only his older brother George Finch-Hatton had children.

When his aunt Lady Isabella Finch died in 1771, in her will, she left him all her Latin book collection from her London townhouse, which he presumably gave to his older brother George for his excellent new library at Eastwell Park, where he was a frequent visitor alongside their sisters (Lady Gordon, Miss Mary, Miss Anne Finch).

In 1805, Jane Austen visited Eastwell Park and met Edward, whom she remarked favourably on her letter to Cassandra:

"Eastwell was very agreeable; I found Ly. Gordon’s manners as pleasing as they had been described, and saw nothing to dislike in Sir Janison. . [The Misses Finch] were very civil to me, as they always are; fortune was also very civil to me in placing Mr E. Hatton by me at dinner."

== Death ==
His latter years were spent at Sandhurst, Kent, the home of his youngest niece, Lady Emily Finch-Hatton (b.1797) and her husband Rev. Alfred Lawrence. Where he died unmarried on 10 January 1841 at the age of 85, "He was very much regarded by all who knew him".

In his will, he left bequest to his nieces and nephews from his brother George, which entailed around £5,000 to Lady Emily's family and £5,000 to Hon. Rev. Daniel Heneage Finch-Hatton's family, he also appointed his nephew, George Finch-Hatton, 10th Earl of Winchilsea as his sole executor. The Earl and Countess of Winchilsea and the Finch-Hatton family held a period of mourning for their uncle in 1841.

Political offices
Preceded by William Wickham	Under-Secretary of State for the Home Department; 1801	Succeeded by Sir George Shee
