= Marlborough House, Brighton =

Grade I listed building in the United Kingdom

Marlborough House
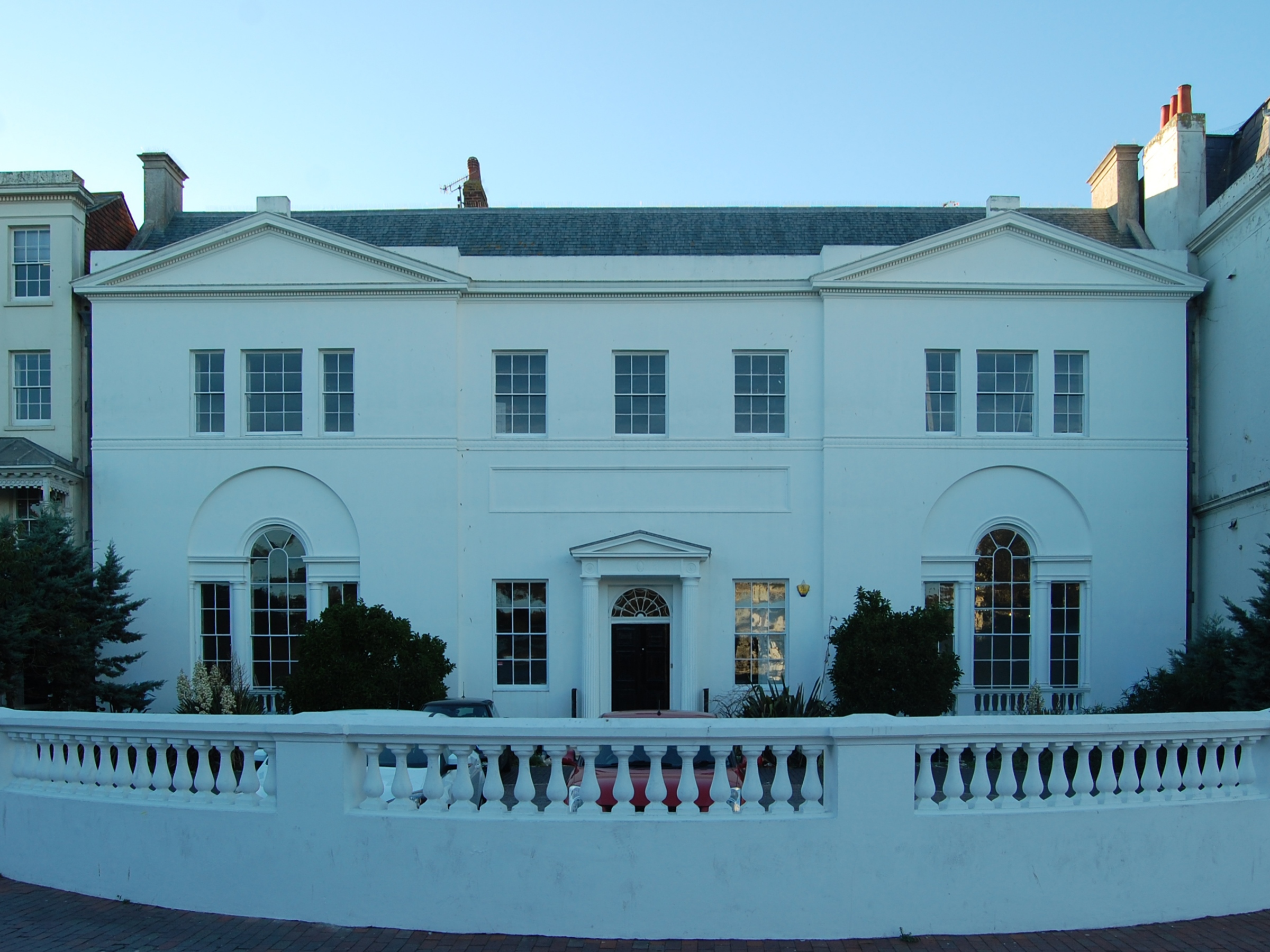
- The building from the east

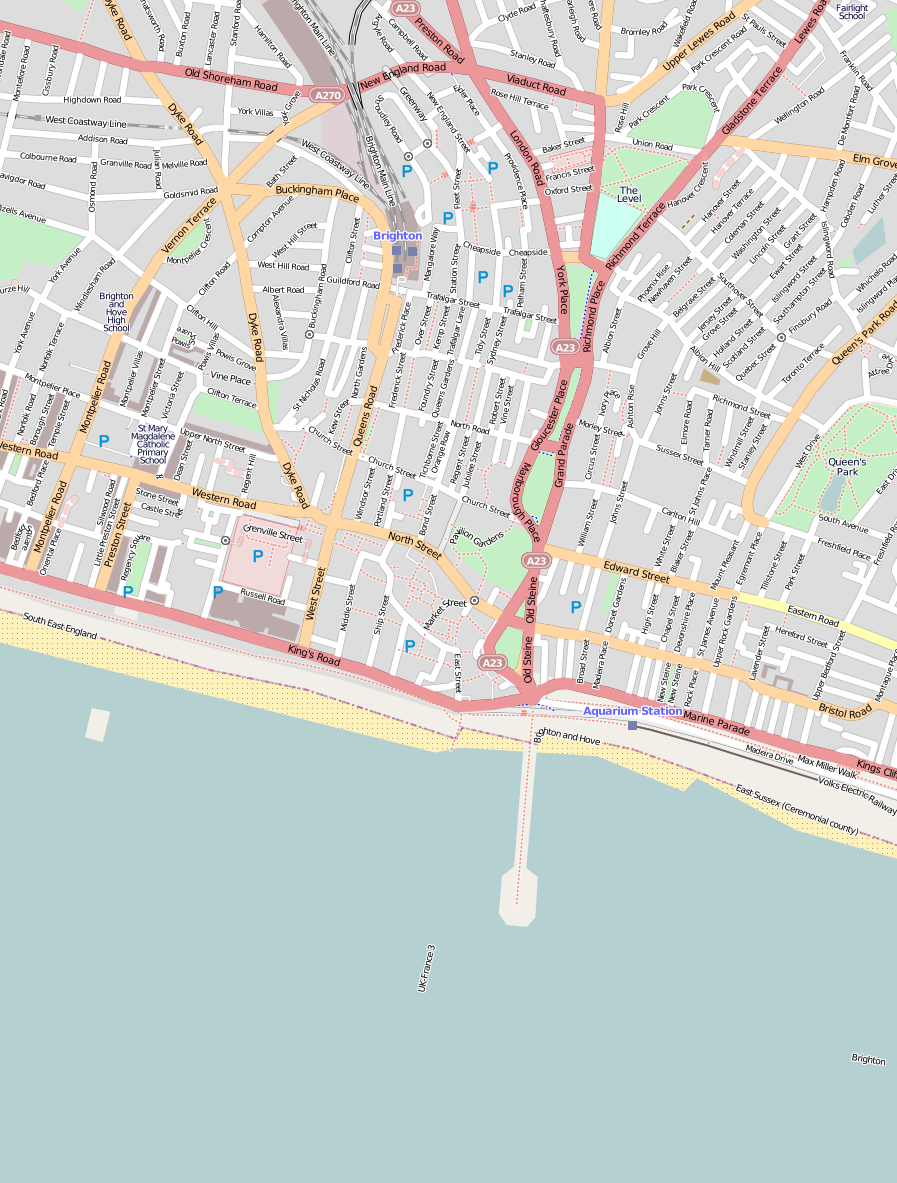
- Location within central Brighton
- 50.8209725°N 0.138509°W
- Location: 54 Old Steine, Brighton, Brighton and Hove, East Sussex BN1 1NH, United Kingdom

History
- Built: 1765
- Built for: Samuel Shergold

Site notes
- Architect: Robert Adam
- Architectural style: Neoclassical
- Restored: 1786
- Restored by: William Gerard Hamilton

Listed Building – Grade I
- Official name: Marlborough House and attached railings, 54 Old Steine
- Designated: 13 October 1952
- Reference no.: 1380671

Marlborough House is a mansion at 54, Old Steine, Brighton on the south coast of England. It is a Grade I listed building. Initially it was built for Samuel Shergold in the 1760s. It was sold to its second owner, 4th Duke of Marlborough, in 1786 it was bought by William G. Hamilton and altered to a neoclassical house by Robert Adam. After being owned by the Brighton School Board and Brighton and Hove City Council, it was sold to a local businessman in 1999. Since then, the building has stood empty and original features have been destroyed, leading to several courtcases. Marlborough House in Brighton is the second most important historic property after the Royal Pavilion.

== History ==
A red-brick building was constructed on the site in the 1760s by local inn owner Sam Shergold. In 1786, the building was bought by statesman William Gerard Hamilton from the Duke of Marlborough. It was Hamilton who employed Robert Adam to change the house drastically into neoclassical style. Marlborough House was then known as Grove House and the Prince of Wales stayed here in 1783, 1789, and 1795, whilst his Royal Pavilion was being renovated by John Nash. The Prince of Wales (later King George IV) stayed with his friend Hamilton for three days in 1789, and in June 1795 stayed there for three weeks with his new wife, Princess Caroline of Brunswick.

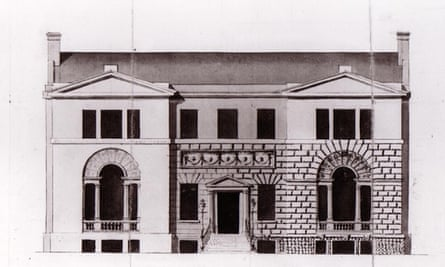
Marlborough House by Robert Adam

Following Hamilton's death in 1796 his house was auctioned, all the lots together was purchased for 4000 guineas by anonymous buyer, the house emerged again with unpaid mortgage of £7575, this was settled by Lady Anne Murray (sister to 2nd Earl of Mansfield, previously residing at Kenwood House), when she purchased the property in 1801.

Lady Anne was said to have run a popular and fashionable circle during the season. She was also very charitable to the poor. When she died in July 1817, she bequeathed the house to her niece Lady Elizabeth Finch-Hatton, not needing another home she decided to sell, the interested buyer was Prince Leopold, husband of Princess Charlotte, for her to spend some time in after birthing, but as she died during negotiations, it did not proceed. Instead it was sold to Thomas Harrington Esq for £9500.

Harrington lived in the house until his death in 1843, his widow, Martha purchased it for £6900. In 1849, she gave the house to her nephew Charles George Taylor. In 1868, he sold it to Francis Henry Beidenbach, a perfumer in Bond Street, for £9500, his family were the last private residents.

In the second half of the 1870s the property was bought by John Beal, a well-known stationer of East Street, who used the basement rooms for storage. Between 1876 and 1879 he entered into an agreement with the Brighton School Board, which let the ground and upper floors as offices, which then the school board bought in 1891 for £7000 and since in the ownership of the local authority.

In the 1990s, Brighton and Hove City Council used Marlborough House as a tourist information centre before selling it to local businessman Tony Antoniades for £500,000 in 1999. Since then, the building has stood empty, occasionally being squatted.

== Deterioration ==
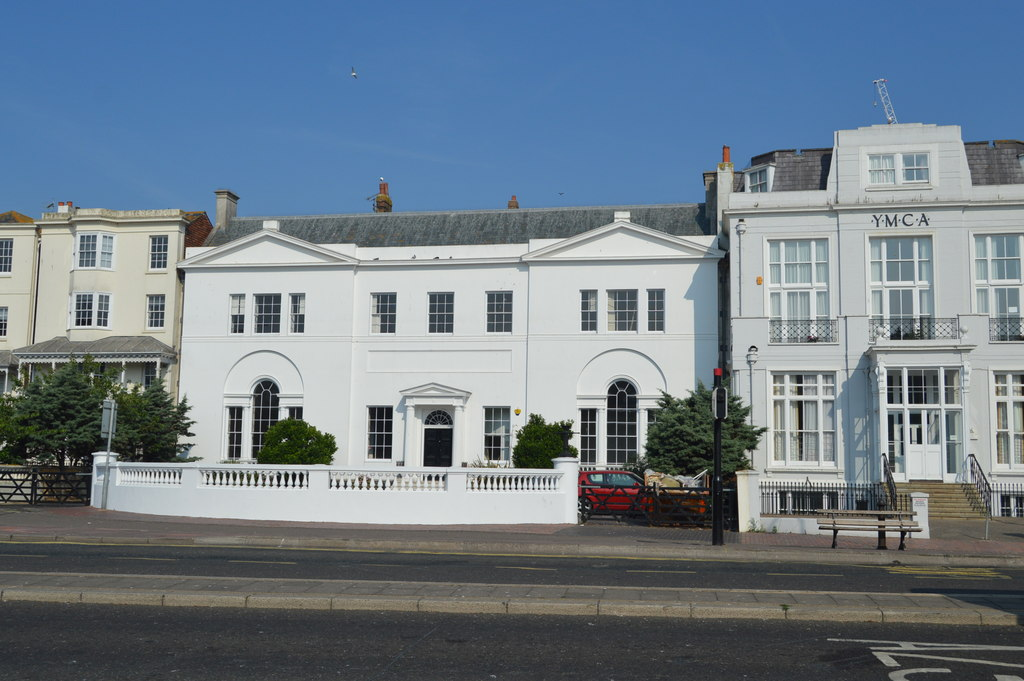
The house located next to Mrs. Fitzherbert Steine House (Mistress of King George IV)

Antoniades at first intended to live at Marlborough House but he never moved in. Initial optimism about the planned renovations faded. By 2015, the building was badly water damaged and the original fireplaces had been removed to a warehouse in London, where they perished in a fire. The building was placed on the English Heritage "at risk" list. A representative of Historic England said "Our hands are tied to some extent if a private owner cannot or will not maintain the building – we are an advisory body."

By 2017, the Regency Society noted that 18th century roof lights had been taken out and mahogany doors had been destroyed. Further, an oil-based render pioneered by John Liardet had been painted over on the front of the building without an application for Listed Building Consent. Brighton and Hove City Council issued an enforcement notice for the paint to be removed, only to be overruled by the Planning Inspectorate in 2018.

By 2019, the Council confirmed it was dropping its legal actions against Antoniades because a new planning application had been made which would correct the illegal changes to the building. Antoniades announced his new plan to turn the building into a wine bar. He had previously stated regarding Marlborough House that "it needs an expert. And that’s not me."
