= Edward Finch (diplomat) =

British diplomat and politician

The Honourable Edward Finch-Hatton MP
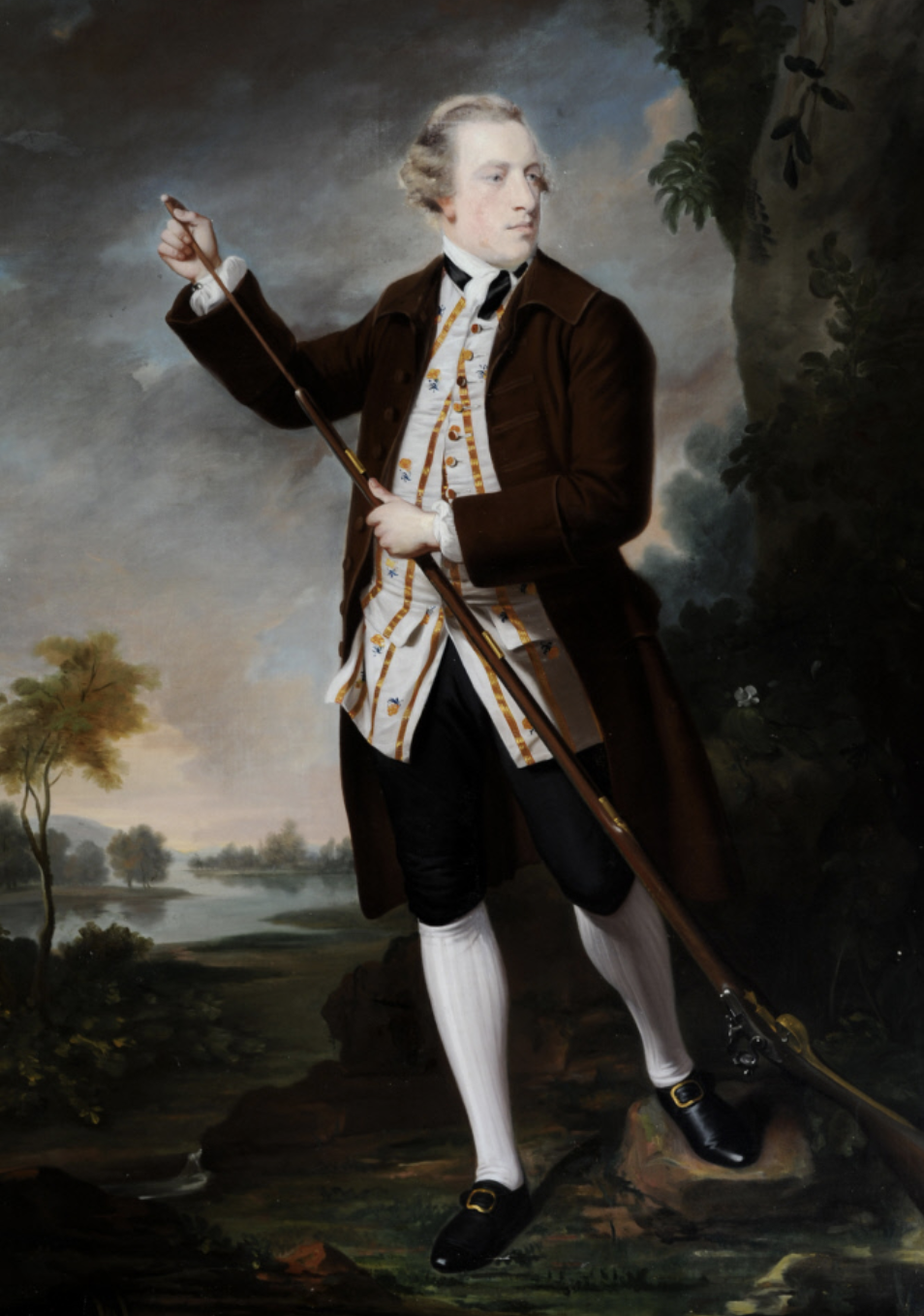
- Hon. Edward Finch-Hatton by Nathaniel Hone the Elder

Personal details
- Born: Edward Finch; 1697
- Died: February 16, 1771 (aged 73–74)
- Resting place: Eastwell, Kent, England
- Spouse: Anne Palmer
- Children: George Finch-Hatton; Harriet, Lady Gordon; John Emilius Edward Finch-Hatton
- Parents: Daniel Finch, 7th Earl of Winchilsea; Anne Hatton

Hon. Edward Finch-Hatton MP (c. 1697 – 16 May 1771) of Kirby Hall, near Rockingham, Northamptonshire, was a British diplomat and politician who sat in the House of Commons for 41 years from 1727 to 1768. The youngest son of the 7th Earl of Winchilsea

== Early life ==
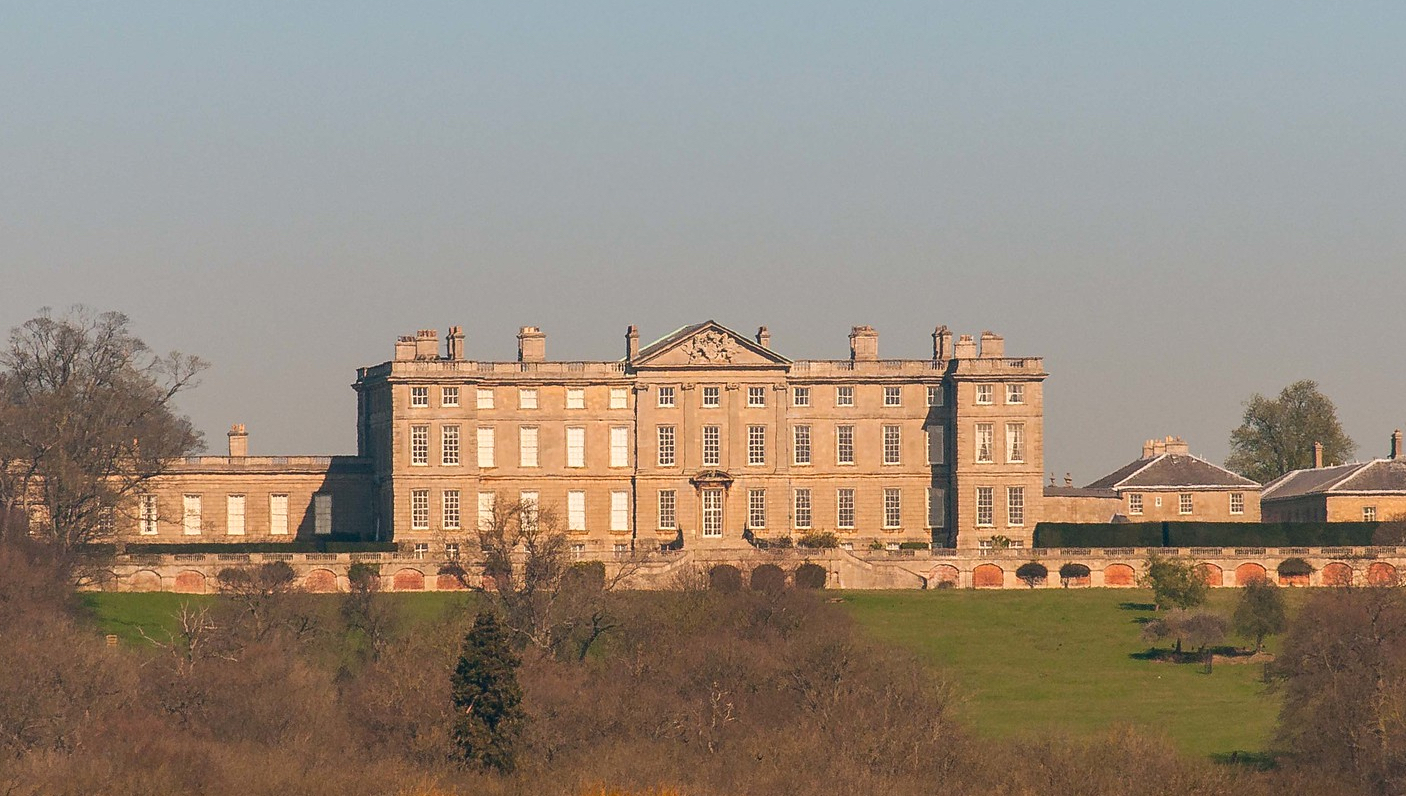
Burley on the Hill House, Rutland (His father's residence, a painting of Edward still hung at the house until 19th century)

Finch was born Hon. Edward Finch, 5th son of Daniel Finch, 2nd Earl of Nottingham and 7th Earl of Winchilsea, and of his second wife, Hon. Anne Hatton, daughter and later heiress of Christopher Hatton, 1st Viscount Hatton. He lived at Burley on the hill with his parents and 11 siblings. He was educated at a school at Isleworth and was admitted at Trinity College, Cambridge on 10 October 1713, aged 16, where he obtained an M.A. in 1718. He then went on the Grand Tour from 1720 to 1723, visiting France, Italy and Hanover.

== Diplomatic and political career ==
In 1724, Finch began a diplomatic career, representing Great Britain as envoy-extraordinary to the imperial diet of Regensburg in the winter of 1724 to 1725, then successively as Minister to Poland, Sweden and Russia between 1725 and 1742 (His letters from Russia have been published in: Сборник Императорского русского исторического общества, том 85: Дипломатическая переписка английских посланников при русском дворе с 1740 г. по 3 марта 1741 г., С -Петербург 1893). He was returned as Member of Parliament for Cambridge University at the 1727 British general election. He spent the longest period as minister in Stockholm, from 1728 to 1739 and is recorded as only voting once in Parliament over that period although he was returned for Cambridge University again in 1734 and 1741. On his return to England in 1742, he was appointed groom of the bedchamber to the King, a post he held despite changes of government until 1756. He spoke on the Address on 16 November 1742, giving an account of all his negotiations and spoke against an opposition motion of 6 December 1743 for discontinuing the Hanoverian troops on British pay. He was returned unopposed again at the 1747 British general election.

Arms of Finch: Argent, a chevron between three griffins passant sable

At the 1754 general election Finch was returned unopposed for Cambridge University, and stood unsuccessfully for Rutland. For the rest of his career he generally supported the current Administration. He became Master of the Robes and Keeper of the Privy Purse in June 1757 and Surveyor of the King's Private Roads in November 1760. He was returned again in 1761 but declined standing at the 1768.

== Personal life ==
On 15 August 1746, Finch married Anne Palmer (b.1709 – March 1795), daughter and co-heiress of Sir Thomas Palmer, 4th Baronet, of Wingham and sister to Mary Palmer, Countess of Winchilsea, by special licence, at the house of his older brother, Daniel Finch, 8th Earl of Winchilsea, in Sackville Street, Mayfair. Their children were double first cousins.

In October 1764, he and his sons but not daughters took the additional surname "Hatton" in accordance with the will of his half-aunt Hon. Anna Maria Hatton. When he inherited the Hatton properties including Kirby Hall from her.

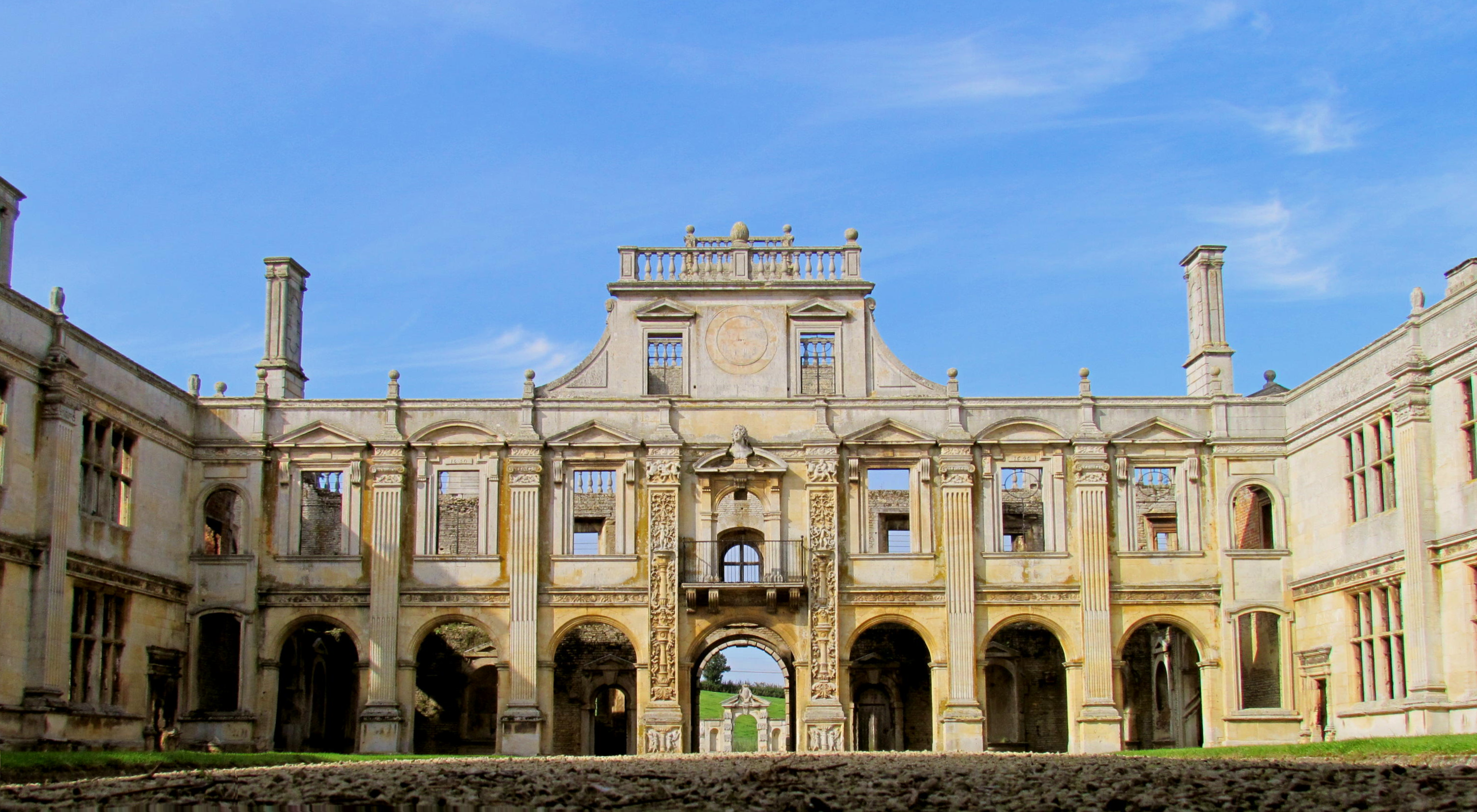
Kirby hall grand order

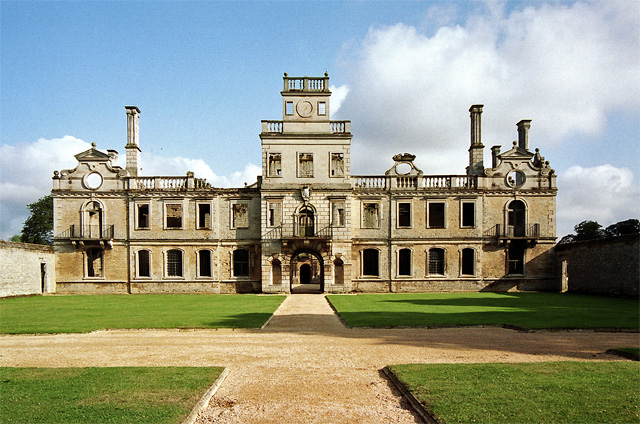
Kirby Hall courtyard

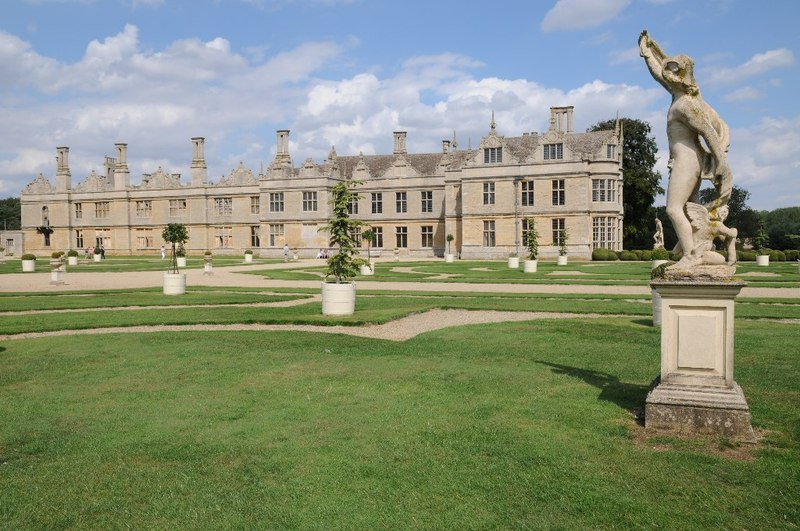
Kirby Hall's facade from garden

Finch and his wife had two sons and three daughters:

1. George Finch-Hatton, FRS, MP (30 June 1747 – 17 February 1823). m. Lady Elizabeth Murray, dau of 2nd Earl of Mansfield, had many issues include George William Finch-Hatton, 10th Earl of Winchilsea.
2. Anne Finch (b. 17 November 1750), unmarried.
3. Harriett Frances Charlotte Finch (b. 19 February 1752 – 1821) "Lady Gordon". married Sir Jenison William Gordon, 2nd Baronet. No issue
4. Mary Henrietta Elizabeth Finch (b. 12 May 1754 – Mar 1822), unmarried.
5. John Emilius Daniel Edward Finch-Hatton (b. 19 May 1755, d. Jan 1841), unmarried.

his wife Mrs. Finch-Hatton (Anne Palmer) of Manchester Square survived him by another 24 years and died in March 1795 at Eastwell Park, their son's newly rebuilt house by Bonomi. Out of his 5 children, only one had issues.

Their eldest son George became an MP, and was succeeded in turn by his own son George Finch-Hatton, who inherited the family's title and became the 10th Earl of Winchilsea.

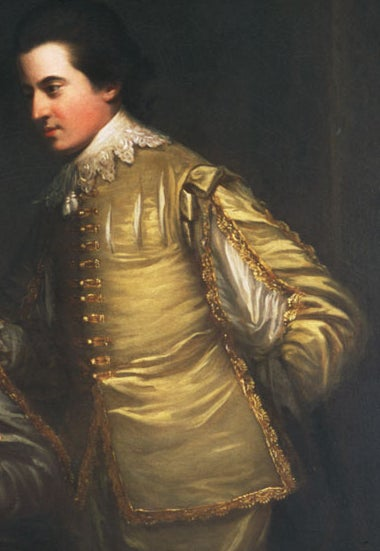
His second son John Emilius Daniel Edward Finch-Hatton (1755- 1841), barrister and senior bencher of the Inner Temple, died unmarried but left bequest to his niece and nephews.

Parliament of Great Britain
| Preceded by Thomas Willoughby; Dixie Windsor | Member of Parliament for Cambridge University; 1727–1768; With: Thomas Townshend | Succeeded by Charles Yorke; Thomas Townshend |
Diplomatic posts
| Preceded by ? | Envoy-extraordinary to the Imperial Diet of Regensburg; 1724–1725 | Succeeded by ? |
| Preceded by ? | British Minister to Poland; 1725–1727 | Succeeded by ? |
| Preceded by Stephen Poyntz | British Ambassador to Sweden; 1728–1739 | Succeeded by ? |
| Preceded by Claudius Rondeau | British Envoy to Russia; 1739–1742 | Succeeded by Melchior Guy-Dickens |
Court offices
| Preceded by Augustus Schutz | Master of the Robes; 1757–1760 | Succeeded by Hon. James Brudenell |
| Preceded by Augustus Schutz | Keeper of the Privy Purse; 1757–1760 | Succeeded by The Earl of Bute |
| Preceded by Sir Henry Erskine, Bt. | Surveyor of the King's Private Roads; 1760–1771 | Succeeded by Thomas Whateley |
