= Lady Elizabeth Finch-Hatton =

British aristocrat (1760–1825)

Lady Elizabeth Murray
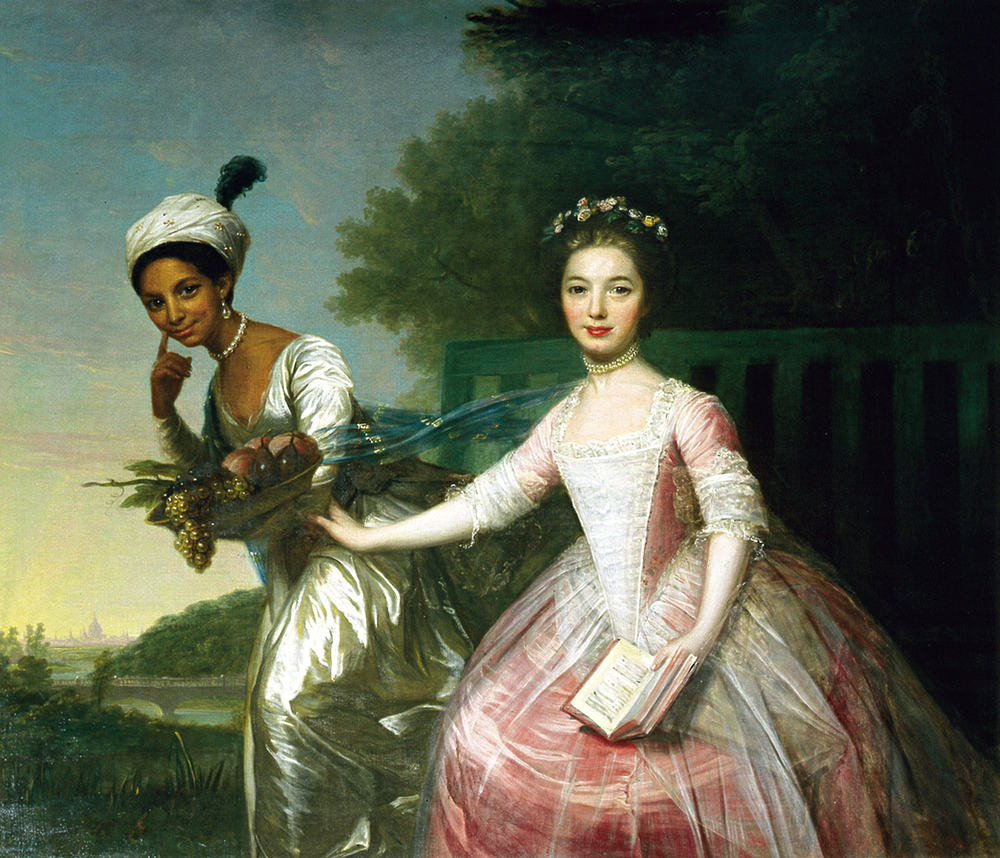
- Dido Elizabeth Belle and Lady Elizabeth Murray by David Martin, 1778. Murray (right) and her cousin Dido Elizabeth Belle
- Born: Elizabeth Mary Murray; 18 May 1760; Warsaw, Poland-Lithuania
- Died: 1 June 1825 (aged 65)
- Spouse: George Finch-Hatton (m. 1785; died 1823)
- Children: 7, Lady Louisa Anne Hatton; George Finch-Hatton, 10th Earl of Winchilsea; Rev. Daniel Heneage Finch-Hatton
- Parents: David Murray, 2nd Earl of Mansfield; Countess Henrietta Frederica von Bünau
- Relatives: Dido Elizabeth Belle (cousin); Count Heinrich von Bünau (grandfather)

Lady Elizabeth Mary Finch-Hatton (née Murray; 18 May 1760 – 1 June 1825) was a British aristocrat and the subject of a notable painting, once thought to be by Johann Zoffany, now attributed to David Martin.

== Early life ==
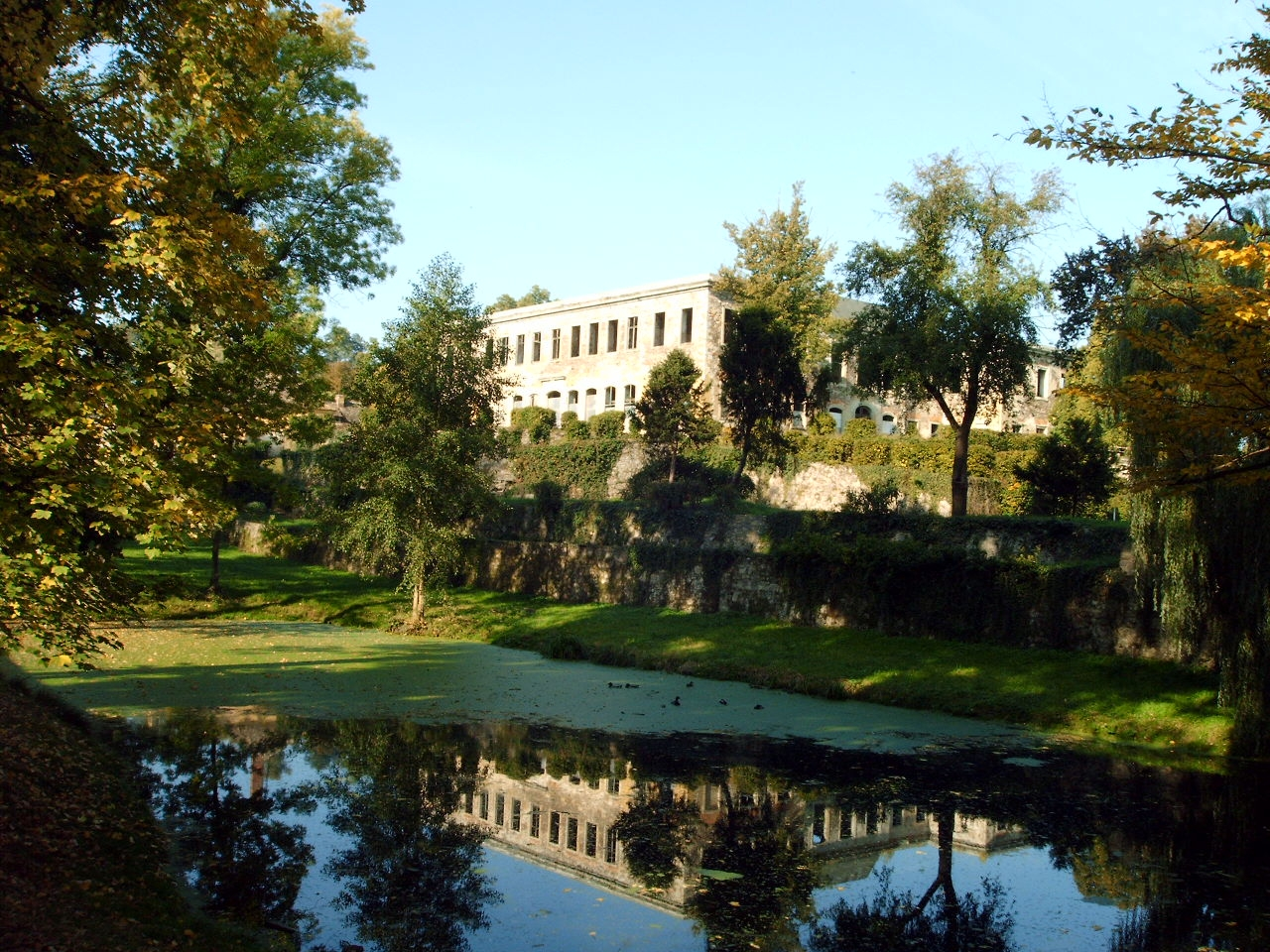
Heinrich Reichsgraf von Bünau residence (Dahlen castle) in Saxony, Germany.

Murray was born on 18 May 1760 in Warsaw, Poland-Lithuania. She was the daughter of David Murray, 2nd Earl of Mansfield, by his first marriage to German Imperial Countess Henrietta Frederika von Bünau.

It was when her father was an ambassador to the Elector of Saxony in Dresden, that he (by then 7th Viscount Stormont) met the beautiful Countess Henrietta, daughter of Imperial Count Heinrich von Bünau.

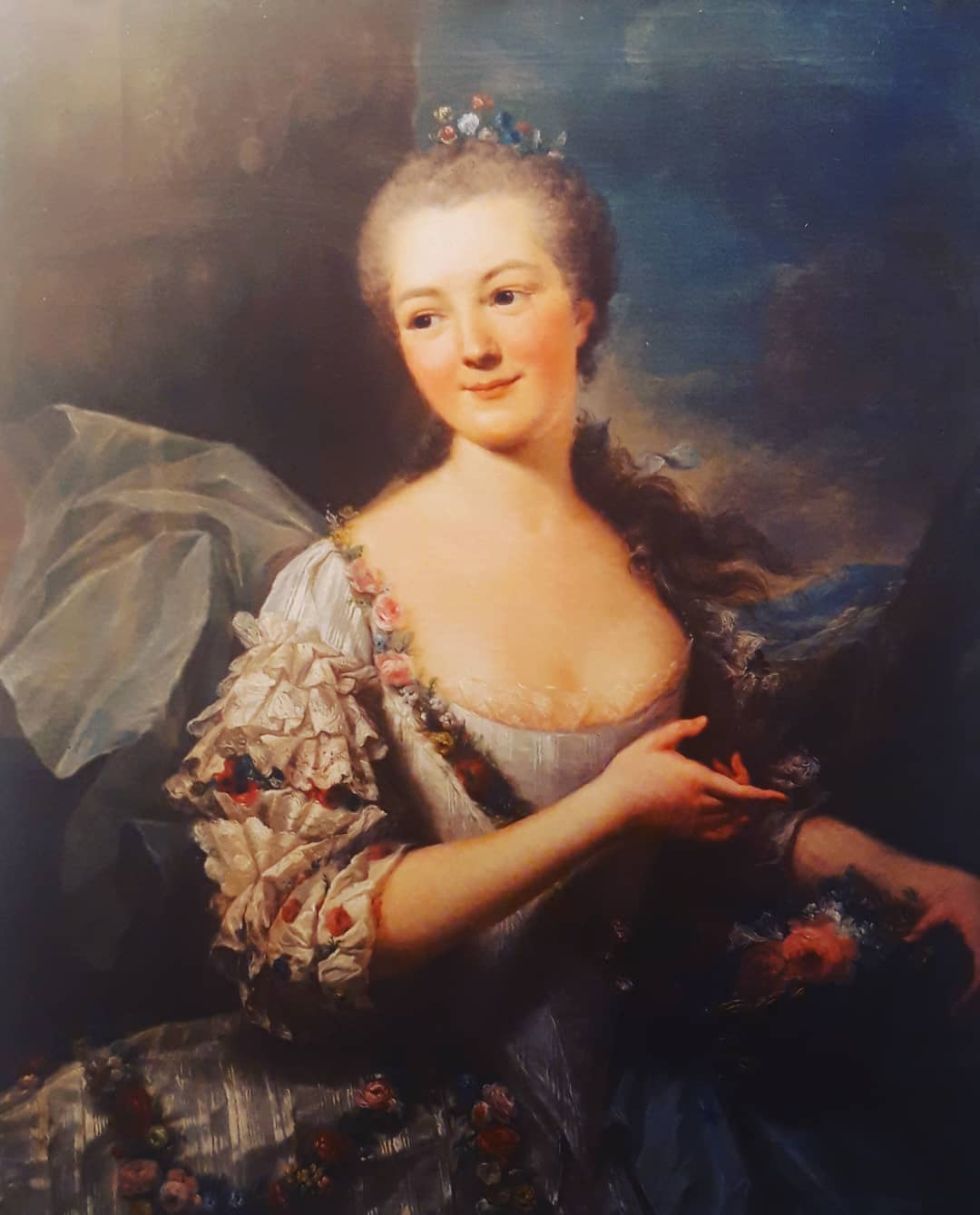
Imperial Countess Henrietta Friederika von Bünau by Marcello Bacciarelli

They went on to be married on 16 August 1759 in Warsaw, Poland. It was a love match, Lord Mansfield himself approved and encouraged his nephew and heir on his courtship. Even though Countess Henrietta was very wealthy, their marriage was unusual for a rising politician, by choosing to marry a foreign noblewoman, Stormont had forsaken the opportunity to gain more social and political connections from a British marriage like his uncle, instead his marriage was based purely upon romantic affection.

In 1761, the Stormonts went back to England to attend the coronation of King George III and Queen Charlotte, at which Lord and Lady Stormont, in company of Lord and Lady Mansfield, took their respective places as peers in their full ceremonial robes. Count Kielmansegge noted that Elizabeth's mother was beautiful and a cousin of the Hanoverian minister in London, Baron Philip von Münchhausen, who was responsible for arranging Charlotte as a royal bride to the King.

During Stormont's embassy in Vienna, the role of an Ambassador's wife was significant. Countess Henrietta was a German-Saxon noblewoman and could hold her own salon, which she did with considerable aplomb. Her father, Count von Bünau, had been an Imperial diplomat and was remembered in Vienna; this helped Henrietta's own integration into the high society of the Habsburg capital. The countess was a woman of great charm, which made up for the relatively reserved manner of her husband. She captivated Prince Kaunitz, State Chancellor and close advisor to Empress Maria Theresa. This helped the Countess to secure her husband's admission to the private circle of the Habsburg ruling family, which made Viscount Stormont's embassy to Vienna a huge success.

The couple had two children, Lady Elizabeth and Henrietta, the younger sister was born in Dresden but died young in Vienna, followed closely by their mother Countess Henrietta, who died on 16 March 1766 in Vienna at the aged 29. She was interred at Viennese protestant church, but her heart was removed and encased in a golden vase which accompanied the viscount everywhere he went and later the gold vase was taken to his ancestral seat Scone Palace.

After the death of her mother in 1766, her father Viscount Stormont had a traumatic nervous breakdown because the love of his life had died and he was left a single parent. Due to this, he was an given extended leave of absence. Because of his ambassadorial occupation and state of mind, he was not able to give Elizabeth a stable upbringing or care. He arranged for Elizabeth to be brought up in England by his childless uncle William Murray, 1st Earl of Mansfield and his wife at Kenwood House. Stormont's unmarried sister Lady Anne also helped raise her niece. Later, Lord Mansfield took in his other great-niece brought from the West Indies Dido Belle.

== Kenwood House ==
Lady Elizabeth Murray was six when she entered the care of her father's uncle the Earl of Mansfield at Kenwood, Hampstead. Her father Viscount Stormont was to inherit his uncle's title and entire wealth including Kenwood House. She was joined shortly by her illegitimate second cousin Dido Belle. It may have been possible that Lord Mansfield took Dido in order to give Elizabeth a playmate, as they were around the same age. While it is known that Belle had the responsibility of managing the dairy and poultry yards and do menial tasks for her great-uncle as was typical for women of the gentry, many doubt that Lady Elizabeth has anything to do with dairy or poultry yards.

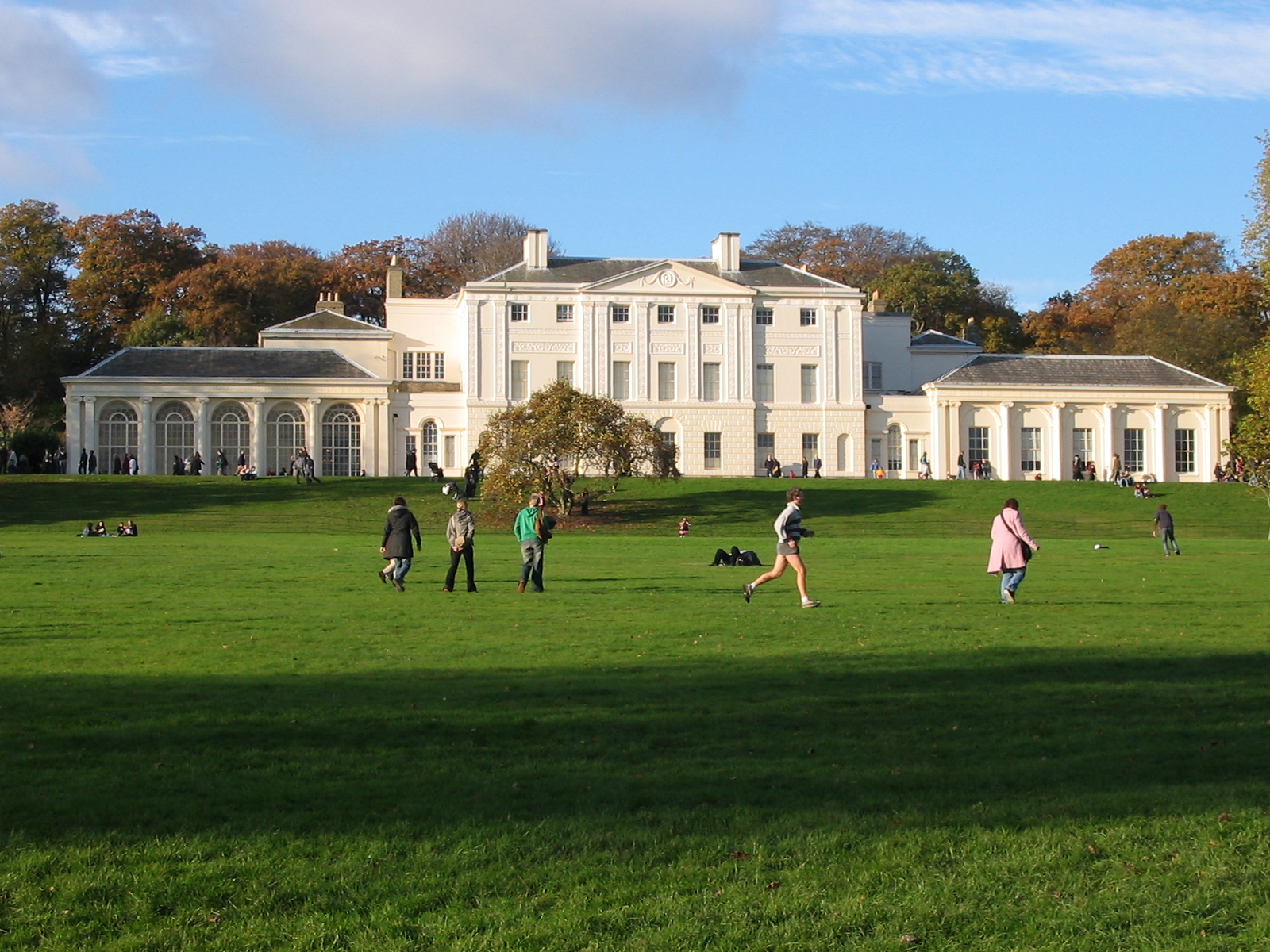
Kenwood House, Hampstead, London

In 1766, one of two unmarried sisters of Viscount Stormont and aunt to Lady Elizabeth, Lady Anne Murray (1730–1817) would come to live at Kenwood at the same time as Elizabeth and Dido, they all were joined at a later date by the second sister Lady Marjory (1730–1799) before Lady Mansfield's death.

Lady Elizabeth received £100 while Dido received £20 yearly allowance from their great-uncle. The disparity may have arisen because of Dido's race and illegitimacy, but Lady Elizabeth possibly received more because her father was Mansfield's heir.

Dido Belle and Lady Elizabeth had a close bond during their time at Kenwood, their bond was noted by an American visitor Thomas Hutchinson to Kenwood in 1779, around the time their portrait was painted by David Martin.

Lord Mansfield had a particular affection for Lady Elizabeth, he would take her riding to visit neighbours. In 1778, Boscawen wrote that she had received an exceeding honor when Lord Mansfield rode with Miss Eliza Murray to pay her a visit. After the visit, Lord Mansfield remounted his palfrey with "his fair niece" and went back to Kenwood, but not long a heavy shower fell which caused Boscawen great disturbance, but "Miss E Murray was so good to write me that they escaped the rain".

Ten years after her mother's death, her father Viscount Stormont remarried for a second time to Louisa Cathcart, daughter of Lord Cathcart on 6 May 1776. Lady Elizabeth's father often visited her and she also regularly visited her father and her stepmother at Wandsworth and at their London home, as a couple of letters have been found, in which she wrote to Mary Hamilton about the birth of Louisa's 3rd son, Charles. Elizabeth also referred to her stepmother as "our dear Lady Stormont" indicating a warm relationship between stepmother and stepdaughter, her stepmother remarked that "(Elizabeth) whole behaviour is delightful. She is an exceedingly clever girl". Elizabeth would write more letters from Kenwood and Wandsworth to Mary Hamilton (Louisa's cousin and close friend).

Her father had wanted to bring Lady Elizabeth to Paris where he was the ambassador, but "Lady Mansfield won't hear of letting her go with us, which I regret exceedingly." On March 1778, France declared support for American Revolutionary War against the British, and the ambassadors to both countries were hastily recalled. Lord Stormont returned back to England at the end of March, just in time for Elizabeth's 18th Birthday in May.

On 7 August 1784 Mary Hamilton visited Kenwood and provided a glimpse into how she viewed Lady Elizabeth:

"went with Miss Eliza Murray to see some of her works she showed me 3 beautiful aprons she was About -- she is a remarkably nice & a good Musician for she not only plays in a Masterly manner but is a composer." from her other account "Miss Murray is Lord Stormont's only child by his first wife who died when she was very young.----She lives with Lord Mansfield & was educated by the ye. late Lady Mansfield & two of Lord Stormont's Sisters who also reside with Lord Mansfield. She is pleasing, good humour'd—well accomplished, & conducts herself with that propriety which ought to distinguish a woman of fashion & good education."

=== Royal balls ===
In the spring of 1784, the Prince of Wales begged Mary Hamilton's uncle to invite her to attend a royal ball at Carlton house, to which Lady Stormont was also invited. On the day of the ball, 10 March, Hamilton wrote in her diary that her cousin Lady Stormont had invited her stepdaughter Lady Elizabeth, Elizabeth was also present when Lady Stormont picked up Hamilton on the way to the ball in her carriage. They arrived at the ball together and were greeted right away by the Prince. Although Lady Elizabeth was invited, Dido Belle evidently wasn't invited.

Elizabeth's father Lord Stormont was a prominent aristocrat and would regularly invite Elizabeth to court functions and Royal balls.

On 18 January 1781, Lord Mansfield, Lord Stormont, and Elizabeth attended Queen Charlotte's birthday at St. James's Palace. Elizabeth was listed among the ladies who were particularly admired, both for their beauty and elegance of dress, she was noted wearing a white satin gown with flower ornaments "simple yet truly elegant".

On 16 February 1781, Mary Hamilton described a Royal ball held at Queen's House, Elizabeth was noted to be one of the dancing ladies, her father Lord and Lady Stormont were also present. The ball began with country dances, the partners were changed after two dances, Queen Charlotte sat in the ball room the whole evening, the Prince of Wales danced with or asked most of the ladies to dance. Hamilton also noted that all ladies dressed in Sack-back gown.

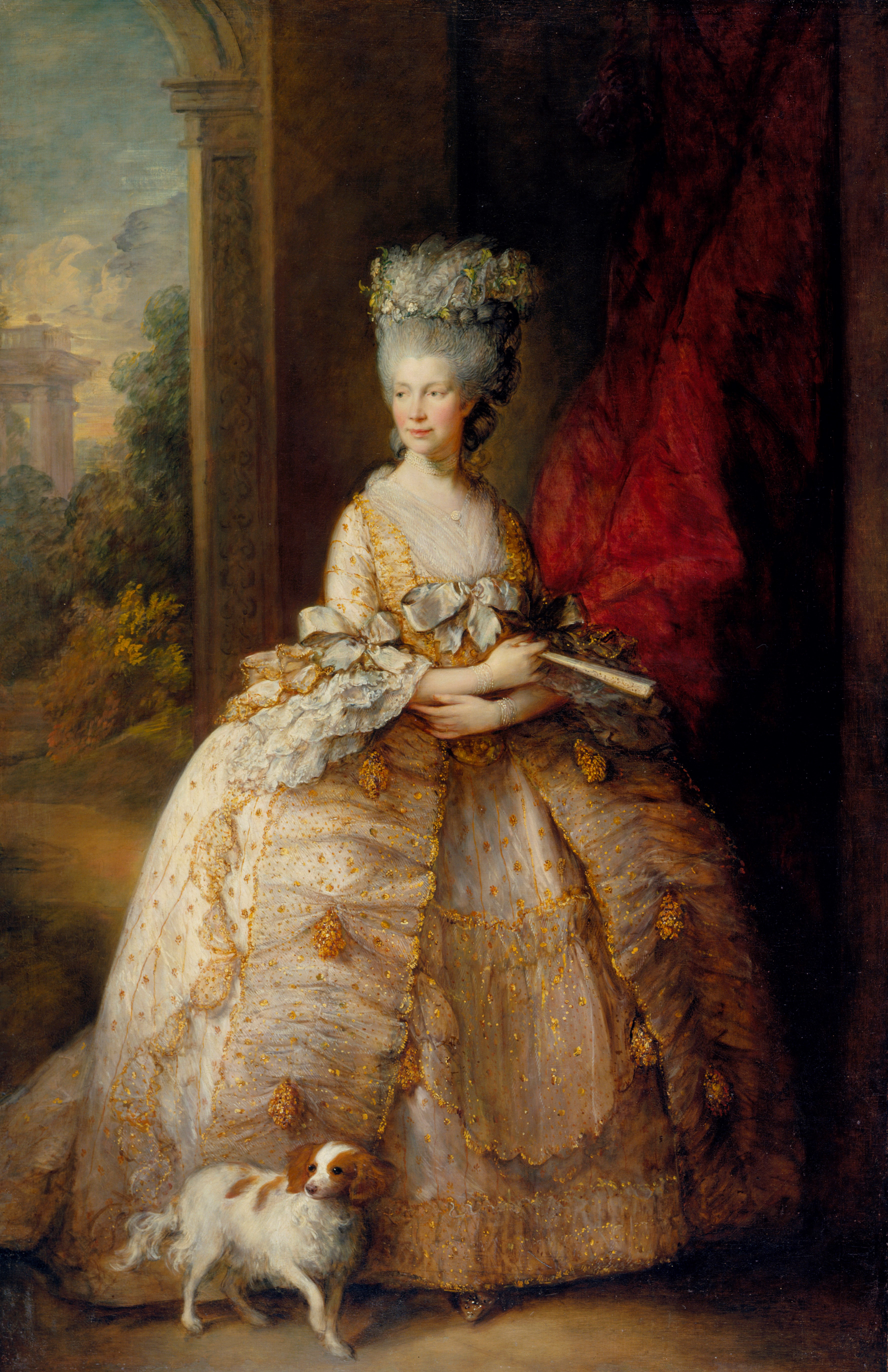
Queen Charlotte in Sack-Back gown by Gainsborough, 1781.

On 12 August 1781, Lady Elizabeth attended a Royal ball at Windsor Castle with her father Lord Stormont, Lady Stormont was absent as she was pregnant. The ball was in honour of the Prince of Wales's birthday, she danced as noted by Hamilton.

Lady Elizabeth was also invited to her stepmother Lady Stormont's ball in January 1782 at her house, this is where she met her future husband George Finch Hatton, as he was amongst the guests' list, the list also included Lady Weymouth, Lord Melbourne, Duke of Dorset, Duchess of Sutherland, Earl and Countess of Aylesford, and Mary Hamilton.

Her cousin Dido Belle wasn't invited to any of the balls, partially due to her status. Throughout Mary Hamilton's diary, she had never once mentioned Dido Belle, despite her numerous visits to Kenwood and several outings with the Murray family, in which she had described all members of the family.

It was rumored that the 2nd Marquess of Downshire means to propose to Lady Elizabeth in 1782.

==== Lady Mansfield ====
After Lady Mansfield's death in 1784, Lady Elizabeth's two aunts Anne and Marjory were given charge of the household accounts, as they worried for their uncle, they also helped write their uncle's dictation. Lady Charlotte Wentworth noted that Anne and Marjory loved their uncle like a father.

==== Engagement ====
Lady Elizabeth was engaged on 5 November 1785 as reported by Boscawen to Delany saying "Hatton to receive such a treasure into her family; for such I have always consider'd this young lady, and I don't believe that you who know her better will contradict me. What a school of sense and virtue ", Dec 1785 "Mrs. Hatton promises herself she shall now soon see a delightful daughter-in-law."

== Marriage ==
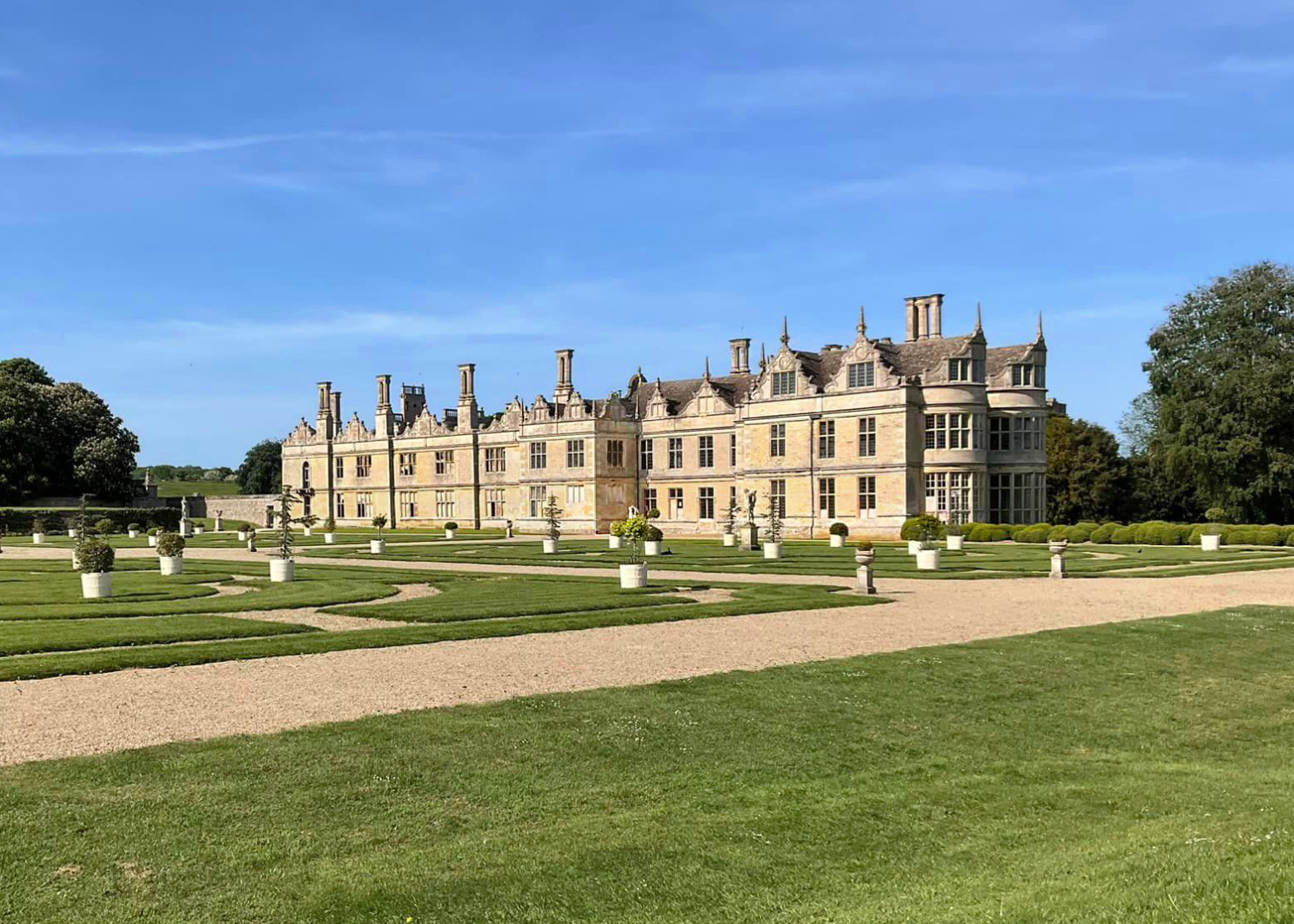
Kirby Hall, Northamptonshire

On 15 December 1785, at the age of 25 Lady Elizabeth Mary Murray married George Finch-Hatton in a love match, at Lord Mansfield's town house by special license. George was from the Aristocratic Finch family and was Lady Mansfield's nephew. He inherited Eastwell Park in 1769 from his uncle 8th Earl of Winchilsea and Kirby Hall from his father in 1771. George also became the heir to his grandfather titles Earl of Winchilsea upon the death of his unmarried cousin 9th Earl. George had £20,000 a year. Elizabeth's stepmother described them as very much attached in one of her letters:

"Miss Murray happily matched with a person who is very much attached to her.... worthy of her. this Mr Hatton Finch Nephew to Lady Mansfield he has very good fortune. perhaps you know one of his place Kirby in Northamptonshire."

After the wedding service by Archbishop of York, the couple headed to Kenwood for the wedding celebrations. After, Elizabeth finally left Kenwood and started her married life at her husband's two vast estates, Kirby Hall and Eastwell Park. Her dowry was £17,000 (£10,000 Lord Mansfield, £7,000 from her father). She would also inherit her aunts' £22,000 in due time. Lady Elizabeth's total Inheritance was around £40,000.

Elizabeth's marriage was happy, and there were a number of comments about her in letters (three at Kenwood) indicating that she was a charming and well-liked girl. The poet Hannah More said "I rejoice that sweet Miss Murray is so agreeably married. I fell quite in love with when I was at Kenwood".

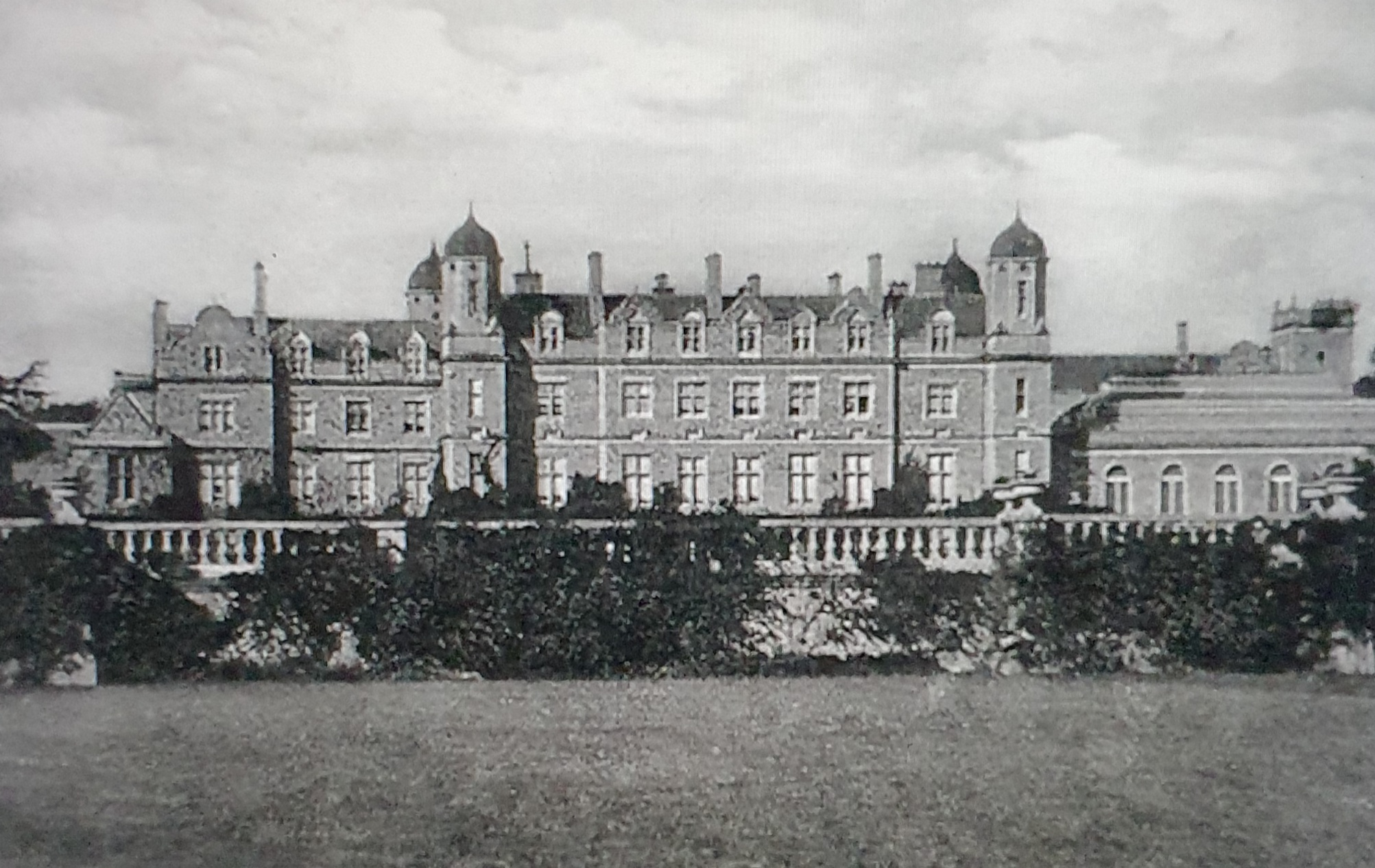
Eastwell Park at Ashford, Kent. Demolished in 1926 and rebuilt as Eastwell Manor. (Lost Heritage)

They rebuilt Eastwell Park between 1793-1799, George gave instructions to his architect, Joseph Bonomi, to ensure that his wife Lady Elizabeth was given a large dressing room, alongside a luxurious cold and warm bath for her private use. This plan was carried out and published in Vitruvius Britannicus. The new house was built on a magnificent scale, with an imposing frontage, and suites of splendid state apartments.

George and Lady Elizabeth had 7 children :

1. Louisa Anne (d. 1 March 1875) m. Hon. Charles Hope (1768–1828), son of 2nd Earl of Hopetoun.
2. Anna Maria (d. 2 Dec 1838)
3. Elizabeth Henrietta (d.1820)
4. George Finch-Hatton, 10th Earl of Winchilsea (May 1791 – 1858), m. 1814 to Lady Charlotte, daughter of 3rd Duke of Montrose, had issue 11th Earl of Winchilsea.
5. Edward Frederick, Lieut. died aged 20.
6. Rev. Daniel Heneage Finch-Hatton (1795 – Jan 1866) m. Lady Louisa Greville, daughter of 2nd Countess of Mansfield
7. Emily Finch-Hatton (b.1797) m. Alfred Charnley Lawrence, had issue.

From the society page of the day, Lady Elizabeth Finch-Hatton was quite a social butterfly, she attended and hosted balls, like 1805 ball at Eastwell Park, "Lady Elizabeth Hatton will give a splendid ball this evening, at her house in Kent; it will be attended by all elegance and fashion of the neighborhood". She would also arranged balls for her three younger daughters:

“Saint James Chronicle 10 May 1817 Lady Finch Hatton's Grand Ball – this elegant Lady opened Mansfield House, in Portland Place, on Thursday evening, with a ball and supper. It was a juvenile party, for the express purpose of introducing the three accomplished Misses Hatton into the fashionable world.”

Elizabeth seemed to have a close relationship with her brother the 3rd Earl of Mansfield, as he was frequently educated at Kenwood, he named his second daughter after Elizabeth. He would also allow Lady Elizabeth to host balls at Mansfield House, 37 Portland Place, the most luxurious house in the street, purchased by their father for a staggering £8,000 and furnished for £7,000 in 1778, a house they frequented growing up. Her sister in law, the Countess of Mansfield would also invite her to her balls.

In the early 1820s, Lady Elizabeth presented her daughter Emily as a debutante at Buckingham Palace to King George IV. Elizabeth was noted to be wearing a white satin gauze and a fawn color train with a headdress decorated with diamonds and feathers. Her daughter (Emily) wore a white tulle dress, richly embroidered with pearls and a train of blue silk with a pearl and feathers headdress, while her other daughter (Anna Maria) wore a net dress with pearls over white satin and an elegantly trimmed lilac train.

Elizabeth died on 1 June 1825, at the age of 65 at 10 York Place, Edinburgh.

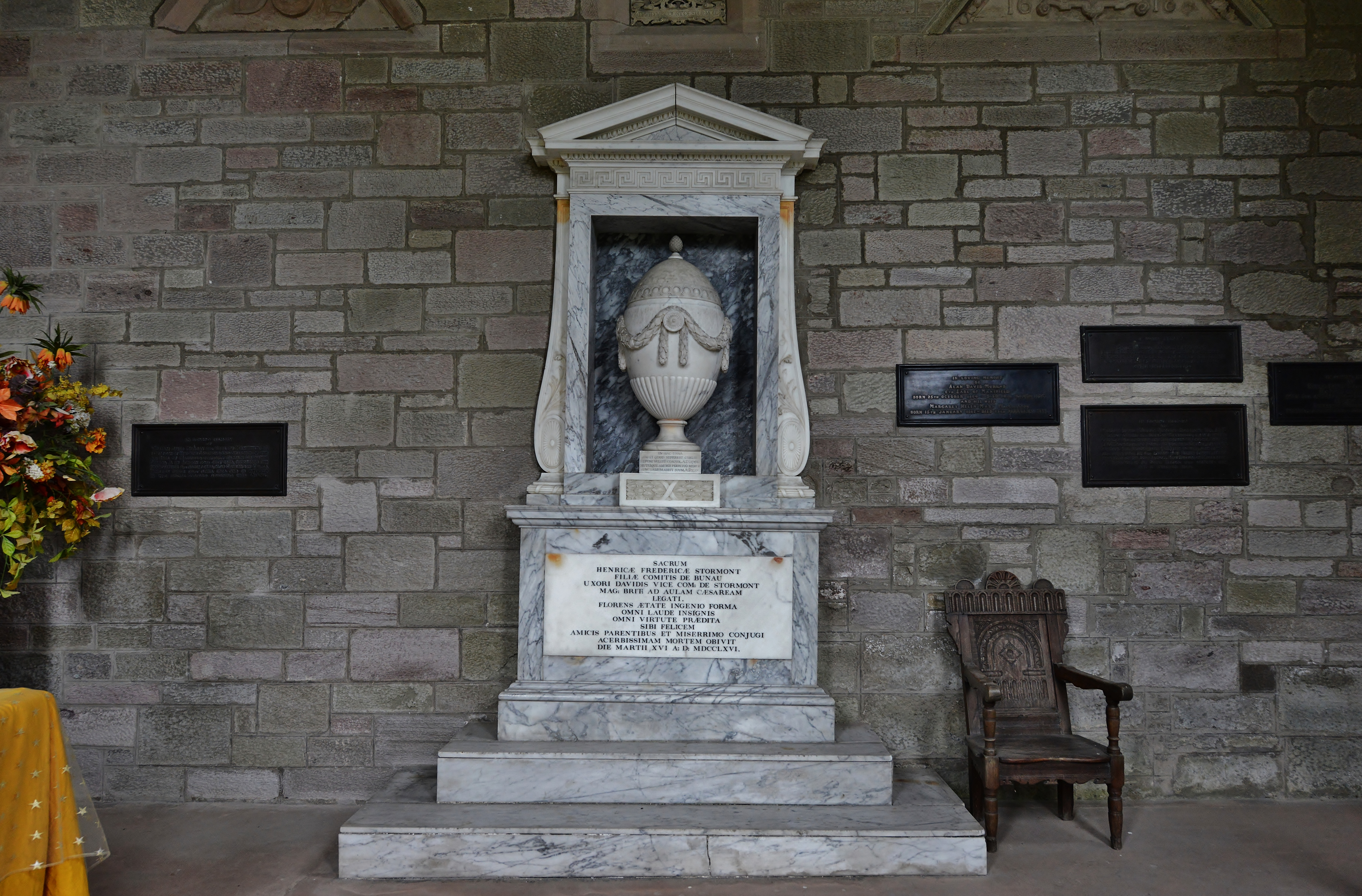
Countess Henrietta Frederica's memorial at Scone Palace. Her father requested that when he died, his heart was to be reunited with her mother in this vase.

== Descendants ==
Lady Elizabeth Murray was the great-grandmother of Denys Finch-Hatton, known as a big game hunter and the lover of Danish author Karen von Blixen who wrote "Out of Africa". In the movie, Denys was played by Robert Redford and Blixen by Meryl Streep.

Denys's older brother was Guy Montagu George Finch-Hatton, 14th Earl of Winchilsea & 9th Earl of Nottingham, who married Margaretta Armstrong Drexel, a wealthy heiress from Drexel banking family. Their son and heir married the third daughter of Gladys Vanderbilt.

Elizabeth was also the ancestor of actress Anna Chancellor, her other direct descendants are currently still the holders of the title Daniel Finch-Hatton, 17th Earl of Winchilsea, The heir apparent is the present holder's son Tobias Joshua Stormont Finch-Hatton, Viscount Maidstone (born 1998).

== In popular culture ==
- Let Justice Be Done by Mixed Blessings Theatre Group – a 2008 play featuring the possible influence that Elizabeth Lindsay's cousin Dido Elizabeth Belle might have had on the Somerset v Stewart ruling of 1772.
- Sarah Gadon portrayed Lady Elizabeth in the film Belle (2013).
