= George Alfred Lawrence =

British novelist and barrister

- Born: 25 March 1827; Buxted, Sussex, England
- Died: 23 September 1876 (aged 49); Edinburgh, Scotland
- Education: Rugby School; Balliol College, Oxford
- Occupations: Novelist; barrister
- Spouse: Mary Ann Georgiana Kirwan (m. 1851)
- Children: 2
- Parent(s): Alfred Charnley Lawrence; Lady Emily Finch-Hatton
- Relatives: Lady Elizabeth Finch-Hatton (grandmother); George Finch-Hatton (grandfather); George Finch-Hatton, 10th Earl of Winchilsea (uncle)

George Alfred Lawrence (25 March 1827 – 23 September 1876) was a British novelist and barrister.

== Biography ==
George Alfred Lawrence was born at Buxted, Sussex, the eldest child of Rev. Alfred Charnley Lawrence, Curate of Uxfield Chapel, Buxted, and Lady Emily Finch-Hatton (1797-1868), daughter of George Finch-Hatton and Lady Elizabeth Murray. She was also the sister of George William Finch-Hatton, 5th Earl of Nottingham and 10th Earl of Winchilsea. His father had been educated at Christ College, Cambridge, B.A. in 1813, and M.A. in 1818, and later became rector of Sandhurst, Kent from 1831-1857, he died in 1867.

George was educated at Rugby and at Balliol College, Oxford, and in 1851 married Mary Ann Georgiana Kirwan, daughter of Patrick Kirwan of Cregg Castle and Louisa Browne of Castlemacgarrett, whose siblings were Dominick Browne, 1st Baron Browne and Henrietta Browne, Viscountess Dillon. Her father Patrick Kirwan of Cregg was from the ancient Kirwan family and the nephew and heir of Richard Kirwan.

George and Mary had at least two sons:

1. George Patrick Charles Lawrence (b.1859-1908) barrister at law married Hon. Hildegarde Davey, daughter of Baron Davey. Lawrence was described as "a gentleman (class) like his father" had issue:
  - Patrick Lawrence (b.1890-1970)
  - Guy Francis Lawrence (b.1893)
  - Margaret Hildegrade Lawrence
  - Eleonora Mary Lawrence
2. Francis Richard Hatton Lawrence (b.1860)

He was called to the bar at the Inner Temple in 1852, but soon abandoned the law for literature.

Guy Livingstone Hardcover

In 1857 he published anonymously a first novel, Guy Livingstone, "portraying a more violent picture of Rugby School than Thomas Hughes." This gained great popularity and large sale. He went on to write several more tales in what has been called the "muscular school" of novel-writing, introducing into English fiction a beau sabreur type of hero, great in sport and love and war. Sword and Gown (1859), for example, "is a bigamy story, climaxing in the Charge of the Light Brigade". The gentleman protagonist of Barren Honour (1862) dies in a shipwreck. It has been called "a study of magnificently chivalrous self-destruction".

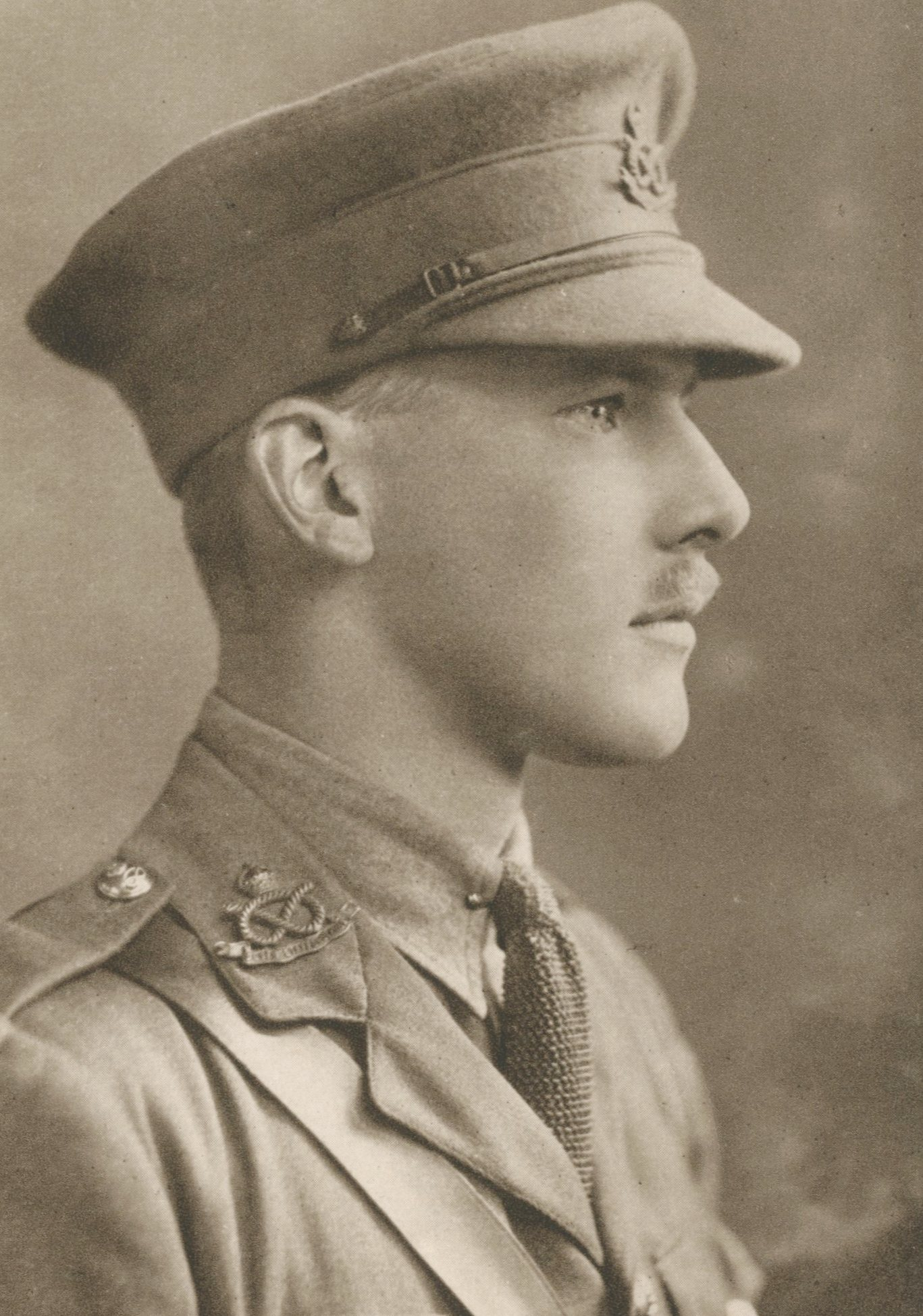
His grandson Guy Francis Lawrence (b.1893-1918)

On the outbreak of the American Civil War Lawrence went to America with the intention of joining the Confederate Army. He was taken prisoner and only released after correspondence with the ambassador Lord Lyons on promising to return to England. He travelled much in later years and died, at 134 George Street, Edinburgh, on 23 Sept. 1876.

== Novels ==
- Guy Livingstone; or, Thorough (1857)
- Sword and Gown (1859)
- Barren Honour (1862)
- Border and Bastille (1863)
- Maurice Dering; or, The Quadrilateral (1864)
- Sans Merci; or, Kestrels and Falcons (1866)
- Brakespeare; or The Fortunes of a Free Lance (1868)
- Breaking a Butterfly; or Blanche Ellerslie's Ending (1869)
- Anteros (1871)
- Silverland (1873)
- Hagarene (1874)
