= Henrietta Murray, Viscountess Stormont =

German-British aristocrat (1737–1766)

The Right Honourable The Viscountess Stormont
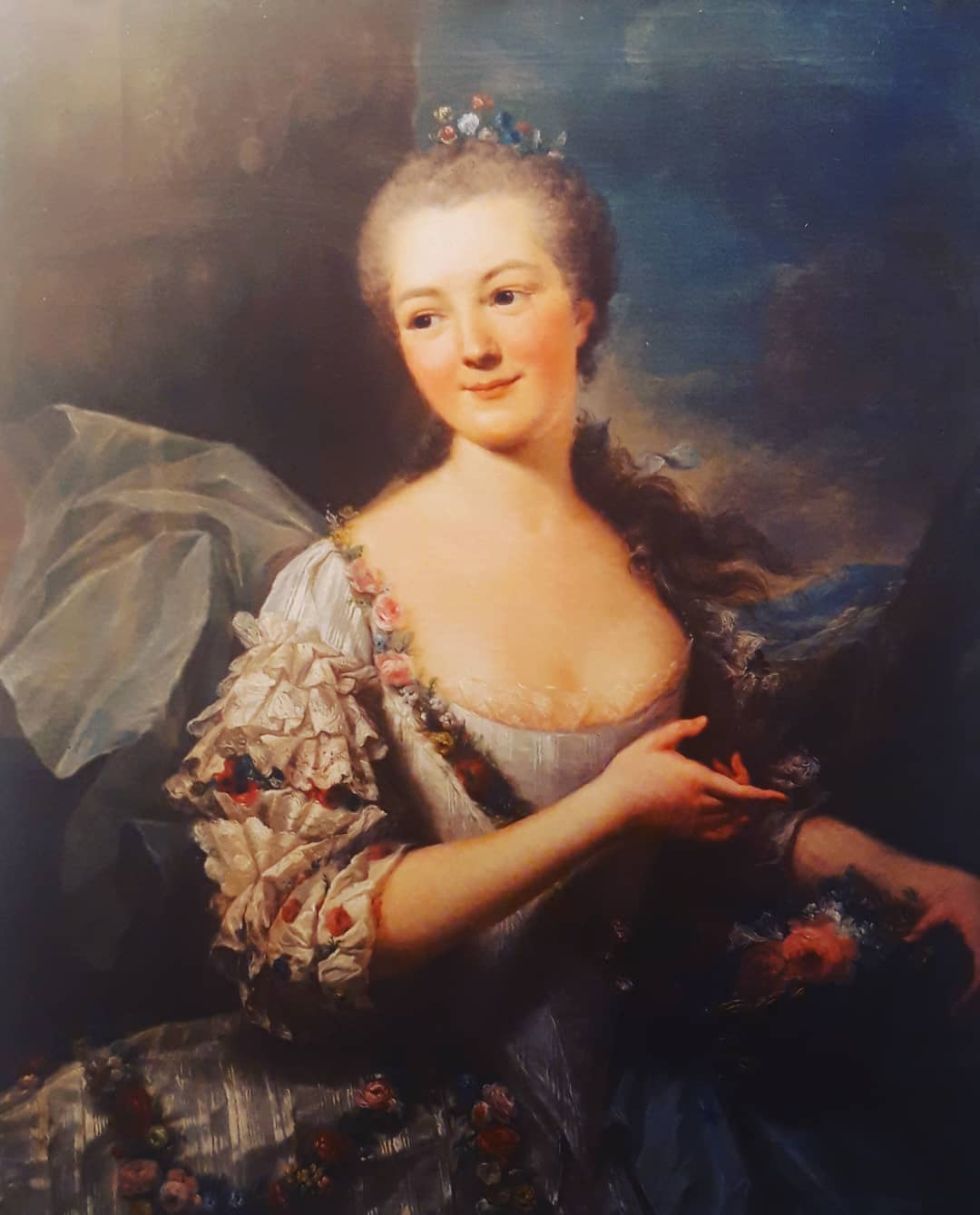
- 1759 portrait of Lady Stormont in her silver-thread wedding gown by Marcello Bacciarelli (Scone Palace collection)

Personal details
- Born: Henrietta Friederika Gräfin von Bünau; 31 January 1737 Saxony, Holy Roman Empire
- Died: 16 March 1766 (aged 29) Vienna, Austria, Holy Roman Empire
- Spouse(s): Frederik de Berregaard (died 1757); David Murray, 7th Viscount Stormont
- Children: Lady Elizabeth Finch-Hatton; The Hon. Henrietta Anne Murray
- Parent: Heinrich Reichsgraf von Bünau

Henrietta Friederika Murray, Viscountess Stormont (née Countess Henrietta Friederika von Bünau; 1737–1766) was a German salonnière. Born into a noble family of imperial comital rank, she later married the British ambassador David Murray, 7th Viscount Stormont after the pair fell in love in Dresden. She accompanied her husband to his diplomatic post at the Habsburg court in Vienna, where she held salons and used her family connections to secure their position in society. Her health declined rapidly and she died in Vienna at the age of twenty-nine. Her husband had her heart embalmed in a gold vase and taken to Scone Palace in Scotland.

== Biography ==
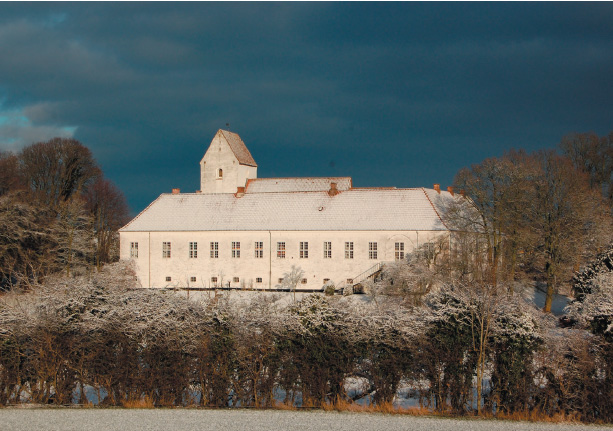
Ørslev Kloster, Denmark.

She was the daughter of Imperial Count Heinrich von Bünau, Privy Councillor and high nobility of the Electorate of Saxony, now part of Germany. She had previously married a Danish nobleman by the name of Frederik de Berregaard, but was left widowed young in 1757. Her first husband came from the rich Berregaard family, which in the 18th century was among Northwest Jutland's largest landowners, he left her his entire fortune and three Danish estates of Ørslev Kloster, Starupgård, and Strandet. (Note: Later in 1760, she sold the 3 estates to Mayor Jacob Lerche for 58.000 rdl equivalent to £20,000 or £5 million today. Previously in 1759 before she sold her estates, the English aristocrats gossiped that she had a wealth of £15,000 or £3.8 million today.) Her inheritance was previously confirmed by King Frederick V of Denmark.

Von Bünau then met David Murray, 7th Viscount Stormont, a British diplomat, in Dresden court. They married in Warsaw in 1759. The marriage was considered one of love, and unexpected, as Lord Stormont was assumed to marry from within the British peerage. She received a letter from her husband's uncle Lord Mansfield welcoming her to the family. Following her second marriage, she sold her estates in Denmark in 1760 to the Mayor of Nyborg for £20,000 (£5 million today). That same year, she gave birth to a daughter, Eliza.

The English aristocrats falsely thought that she was a Polish lady. Horace Walpole also thought of her as Polish and expressed that he can't wait to meet her, and after said she resembled Semele in that "my Lady Stormont brought to bed in flames", a reference to her health.

She went to England with her husband and their daughter in 1762 and was presented to King George III and Queen Charlotte. Another aristocrat from Saxony in England, Count Friedrich von Kielmansegge remarked that she had a beautiful face and was a cousin of the Hanoverian minister in London, Baron Philip von Münchhausen, who had previously suggested Charlotte as royal bride to the King.

Previously in 1761, Lord and Lady Stormont attended the coronation of King George III and Queen Charlotte. Lady Stormont attended the ceremony wearing her peeress’s robe. According to Kielmansegge, the procession of the peers and peeresses was “the most beautiful part” of the coronation, distinguished by its “majestic appearance" of gold cloths and array of jewels.

While staying in England in 1762, her husband appeal a bill to have her naturalized as a British subject, it was approved and she was presented to the House of Lords to take the vow in English, the naturalization made sure that she was recognized as a British subject and hence can inherit British lands and British title.

Von Bünau's husband was then appointed as the British ambassador to Austria in 1763 at the court of Empress Maria Theresa. Her status, as an Austrian imperial countess by birth, helped the couple find acceptance in Viennese high society. Von Bünau's father had served as an imperial diplomat, and through those connections she was able to host successful salons in the Austrian capital. Her charm and influence secured a connection for her husband with Wenzel Anton, Prince of Kaunitz-Rietberg, one of the most powerful State Chancellors and a close advisor to Empress Maria Theresa.

While in Vienna, she gave birth to a second daughter, Henrietta Anne, who died in infancy.

Von Bünau's health was fragile, and she died in Vienna on 16 March 1766, at the age of 29. Following her death, her husband had a nervous breakdown and was granted extended leave of absence from his post at court. She was interred in Viennese Protestant church but her heart was embalmed in a gold vase and taken to Scone Palace.

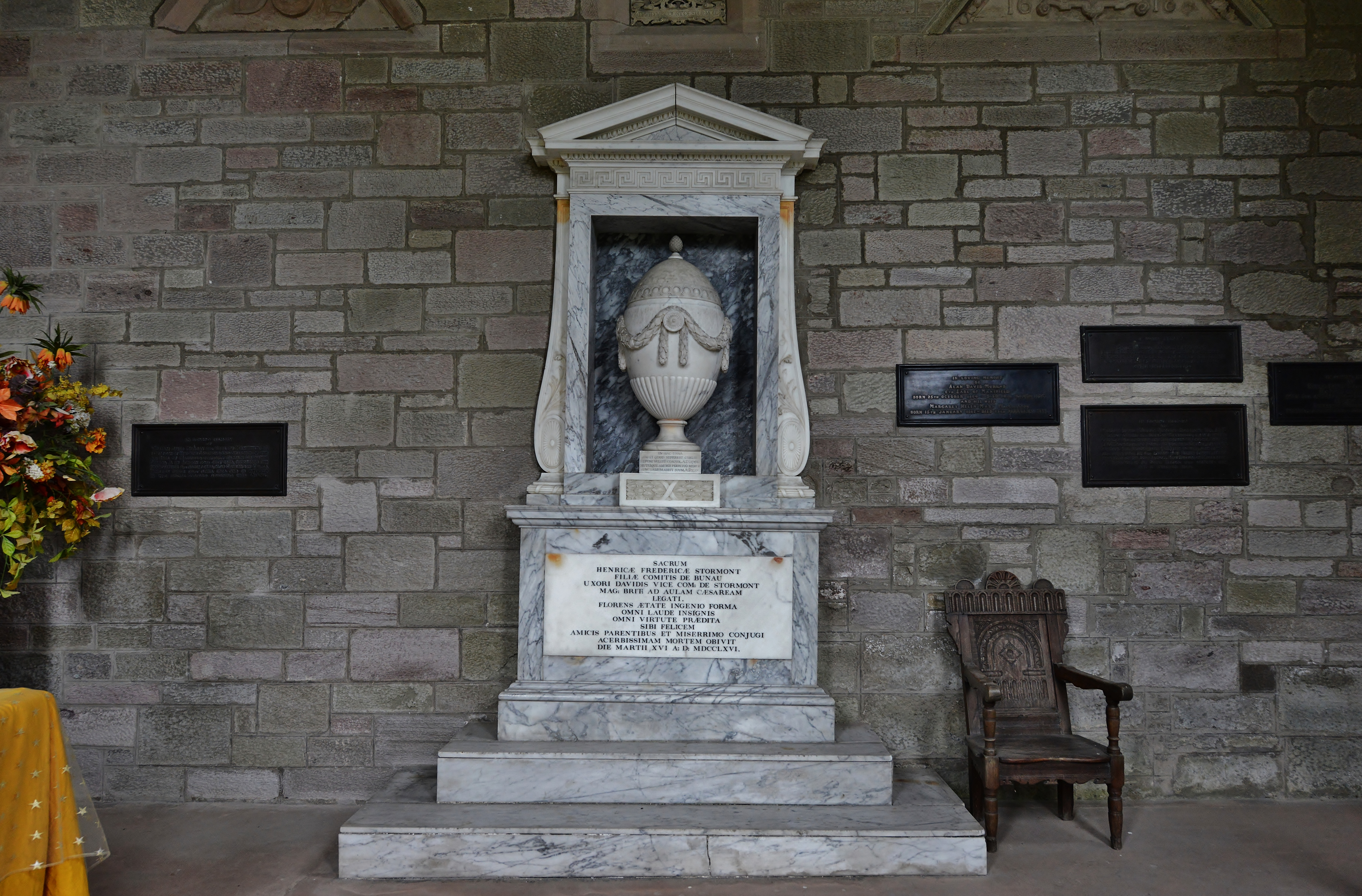
Lady Stormont's memorial at Scone Palace's chapel.

== Scone Memorial ==
Her husband created a memorial for his wife at Scone Palace, which contained her heart that he had carried with him for many years in a gold vase before it was put inside the memorial, later he also requested that when he died, his heart was to be embalmed and reunited with that of his first wife.

The memorial is inscribed "Dedicated to Henrietta Frederica Stormont, daughter of the Count of Bunau, wife of David, Viscount of Stormont, ambassador of Great Britain to the Holy Roman Empire. Flourishing in the prime of life, in talent, in beauty, remarkable for every praise, endowed with every virtue, she met a death happy to herself, [but] deeply bitter to her friends, parents and most wretched husband. March 16, 1766." later when her husband died in 1796 he added "Remembering each other's love forever and now, at last, he adds his own. AD 1796".

=== Remarks ===
Mrs Anne Grant visited Scone Palace in 1777 and was pleased by the monument, "Lord Stormont it seems, was first married to a foreign lady... her heart is deposited in a white marble urn. I was pleased to think how good that heart must have been which could retain such warmth, amidst the frozen formalities and frivolous dissipation of a court."
