= Daniel Finch, 2nd Earl of Nottingham =

British politician (1647–1730)

The Right Honourable The Earl of Nottingham PC
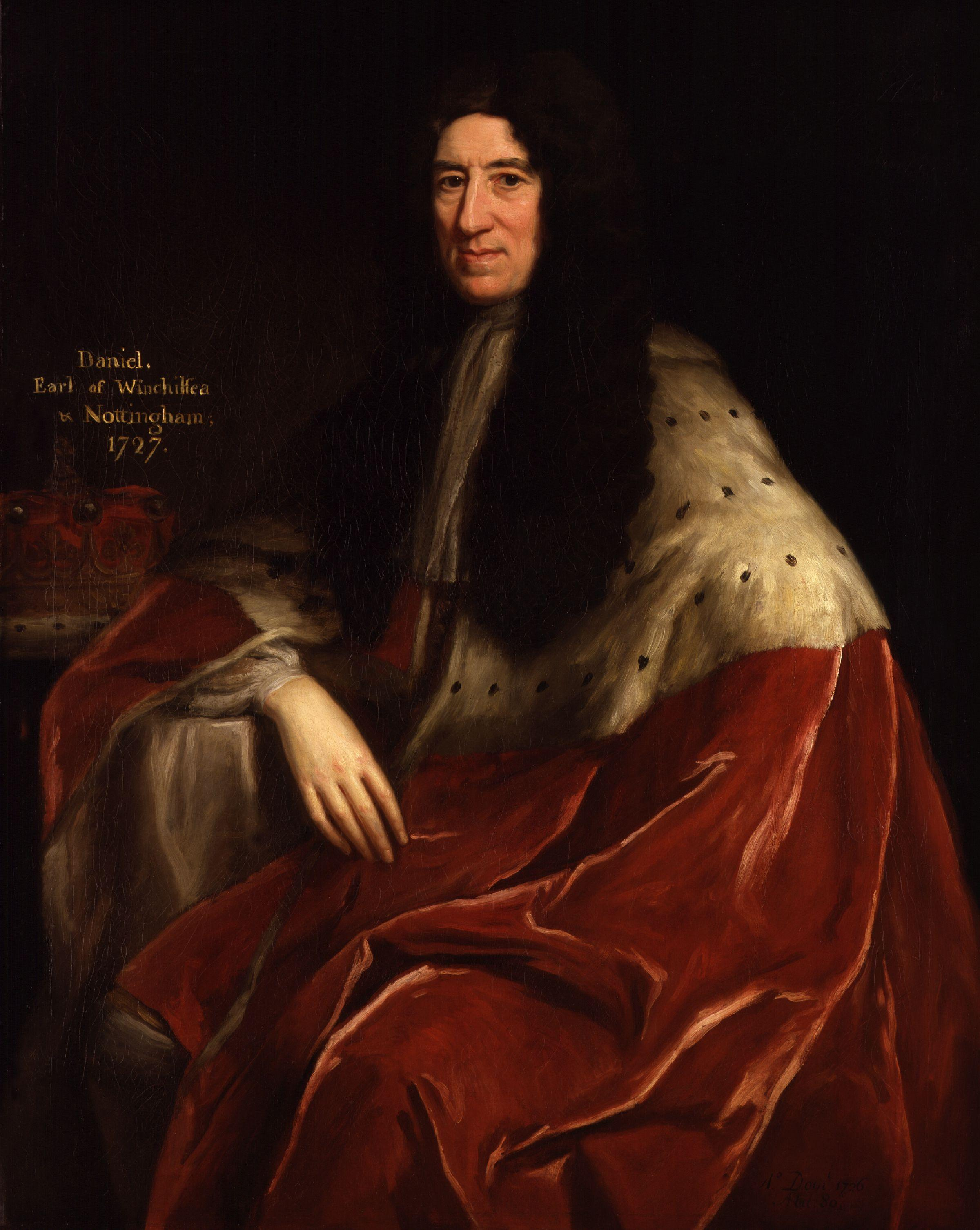
- Portrait attributed to Jonathan Richardson, 1726

Lord President of the Council
- In office 23 September 1714 – 6 July 1716
- Monarch: George I
- Preceded by: The Duke of Buckingham and Normanby
- Succeeded by: The Duke of Devonshire

Secretary of State for the Southern Department
- In office 2 May 1702 – 22 April 1704
- Monarch: Anne
- Preceded by: The Earl of Manchester
- Succeeded by: Charles Hedges
- In office 2 June 1690 – 6 November 1693
- Monarchs: William III and Mary II
- Preceded by: The Earl of Shrewsbury
- Succeeded by: John Trenchard

Secretary of State for the Northern Department
- In office 3 March 1692 – 23 March 1693
- Monarchs: William III and Mary II
- Preceded by: The Viscount Sydney of Sheppey
- Succeeded by: John Trenchard
- In office 5 March 1689 – 26 December 1690
- Monarchs: William III and Mary II
- Preceded by: The Viscount Preston
- Succeeded by: The Viscount Sydney of Sheppey

First Lord of the Admiralty
- In office 1681–1684
- Monarch: Charles II
- Preceded by: Sir Henry Capell
- Succeeded by: The Earl of Torrington

Personal details
- Born: 2 July 1647 London, England
- Died: 1 January 1730 (aged 82) Burley on the Hill; England
- Spouses: Lady Essex Rich (m. 1674; died 1684); Anne Hatton (m. 1685)
- Children: at least 13, including: Daniel Finch; William Finch; Edward Finch
- Parents: Heneage Finch; Elizabeth Harvey

Arms of Finch: Argent, a chevron between three griffins passant sable

Daniel Finch, 2nd Earl of Nottingham, PC (2 July 1647 – 1 January 1730) was a British Tory politician who supported the Hanoverian Succession in 1714. He was known as Lord Nottingham until 1729 when he became Earl of Winchilsea.

== Origins ==
Finch was born in London on 2 July 1647, the son of Heneage Finch, 1st Earl of Nottingham (1620-1682), Lord Chancellor of England, by his wife Elizabeth Harvey, a daughter of Daniel Harvey. His great grandmother was Elizabeth Finch, 1st Countess of Winchilsea.

One of his brothers was Heneage Finch, 1st Earl of Aylesford.

== Education ==
Little is known about his upbringing. He entered Westminster School in 1658, where he boarded for three years at the house of Dr. Richard Busby, the headmaster and his father's former tutor at Christ Church, Oxford. Daniel also went to Christ Church and the excellence of his studies made his father doubt their authenticity. He matriculated at Christ Church as a Gentleman Commoner on 26 July 1662.

In April 1663, his father wrote to him, advising that he "loose not the reputation which I am told you have gayn'd of diligence and sobriety". His father also advised him a month after he had arrived in Oxford "to frequent the publique prayers, and study to reverence and defend, as well as to obey, the Church of England" and when his first Easter away from home was approaching, he wrote, "Nothing can make you truly wise but such a religion as dwells upon your heart and governs your whole life". However, Finch suffered from illness and it may be due to this that he left Oxford without graduating.

Finch went on his Grand Tour from 1665 to 1668, visiting Frankfurt, Munich, Venice, Florence, Naples, Rome and Paris. After he returned to England he was appointed a Fellow of the Royal Society and his cousin Sir Roger Twysden wrote to Finch's father that "every body speaks him a very gentleman, and one you and your lady are likely to have much comfort in".

Later in 1689, he sold Nottingham House in Kensington to King William and Queen Mary for £20,000, the house was then expanded by Christopher Wren into Kensington Palace.

== Career ==
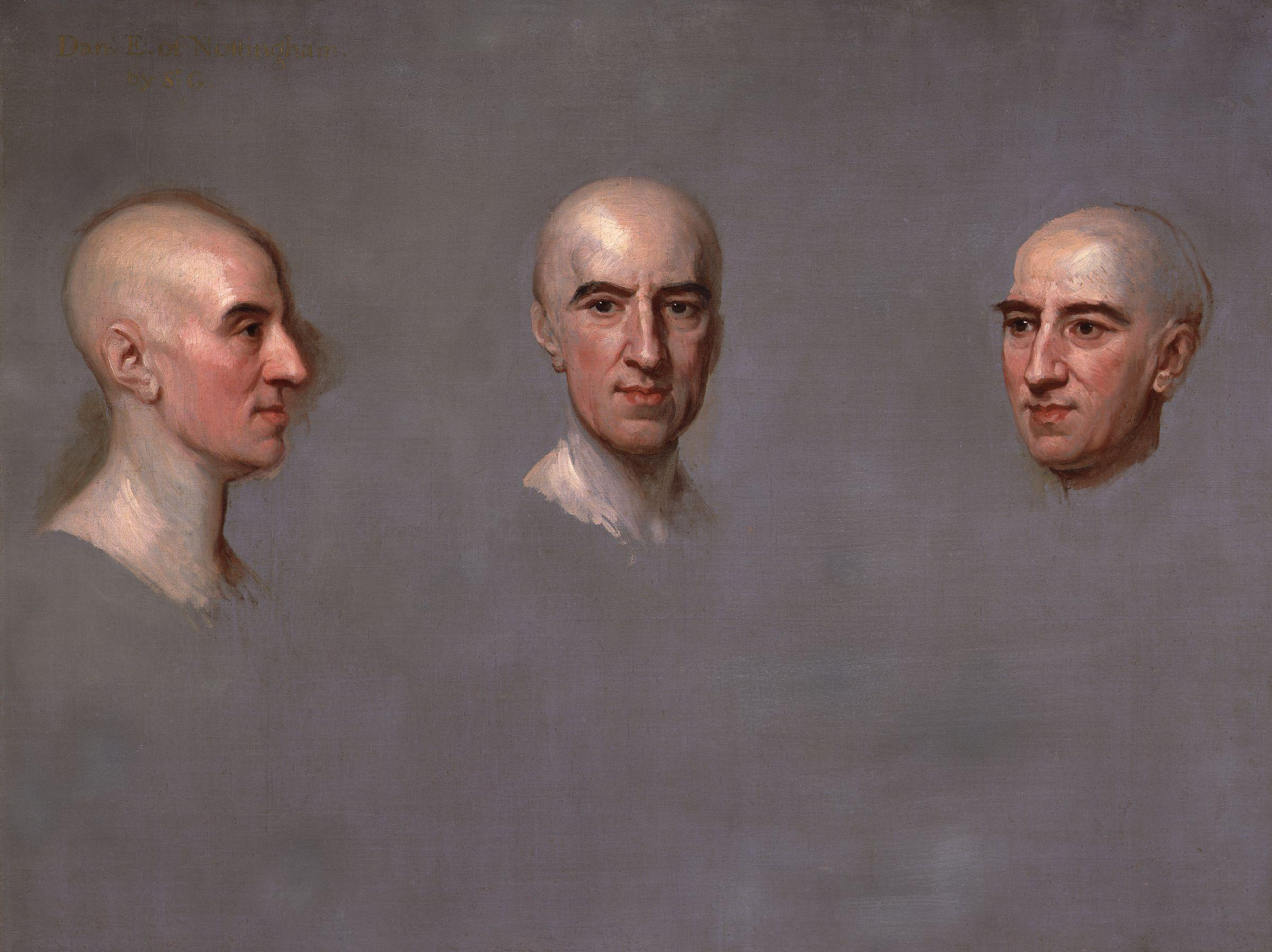
Daniel Finch, 2nd Earl of Nottingham, portrait by Sir Godfrey Kneller, c. 1720

Daniel Finch entered parliament for Lichfield in 1679. In 1682 he succeeded his father as Earl of Nottingham. He was one of the privy councillors who in 1685 signed the order for the proclamation of the Duke of York, but during the whole of the reign of James II, he kept away from the court. At the last moment, he hesitated to join in the invitation to William of Orange and after the flight of James II, he was the leader of the party who were in favour of James being King in name and William being regent. He was author of the Act of Toleration of 1688.

He declined the office of Lord Chancellor under William and Mary, but accepted that of Secretary of State, retaining it until December 1693. Under Queen Anne in 1702, he again accepted the same office in the ministry of Lord Godolphin, but finally retired in 1704.

In 1711, during the War of the Spanish Succession, the Tory ministry of Robert Harley, 1st Earl of Oxford was attempting to negotiate peace with France. On 7 December Finch moved the 'No peace without Spain' amendment to the vote of thanks, which condemned any peace with France that left Spain and the West Indies in possession of a member of the House of Bourbon. Finch spoke for one hour and declared that "though he had fourteen children, he would submit to live upon five hundred pounds a year rather than consent to those dark and unknown conditions of peace".

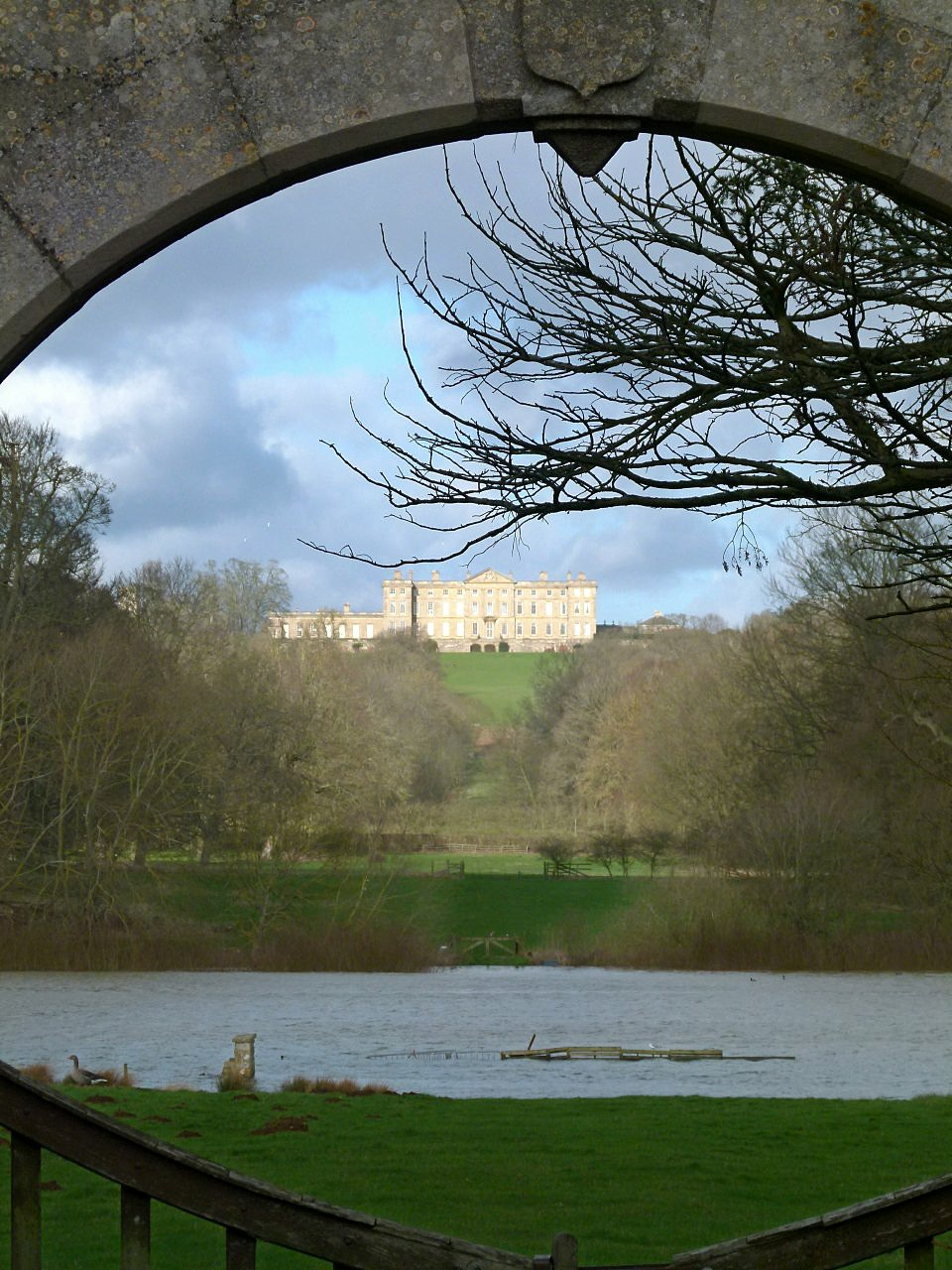
Burley House viewed from Stamford Road.

Nottingham built Burley House in Rutland, he was to a large extent his own architect and involved himself in the minutiae of its construction, before embarking on the project, Lord Nottingham consulted Sir Christopher Wren, but instead employed Henry Dormer (died 1727) just to supervise its building. It was completed in 1705, the main block stretches 200 feet long across 15 windows. He and his large family had moved in prior its completion.

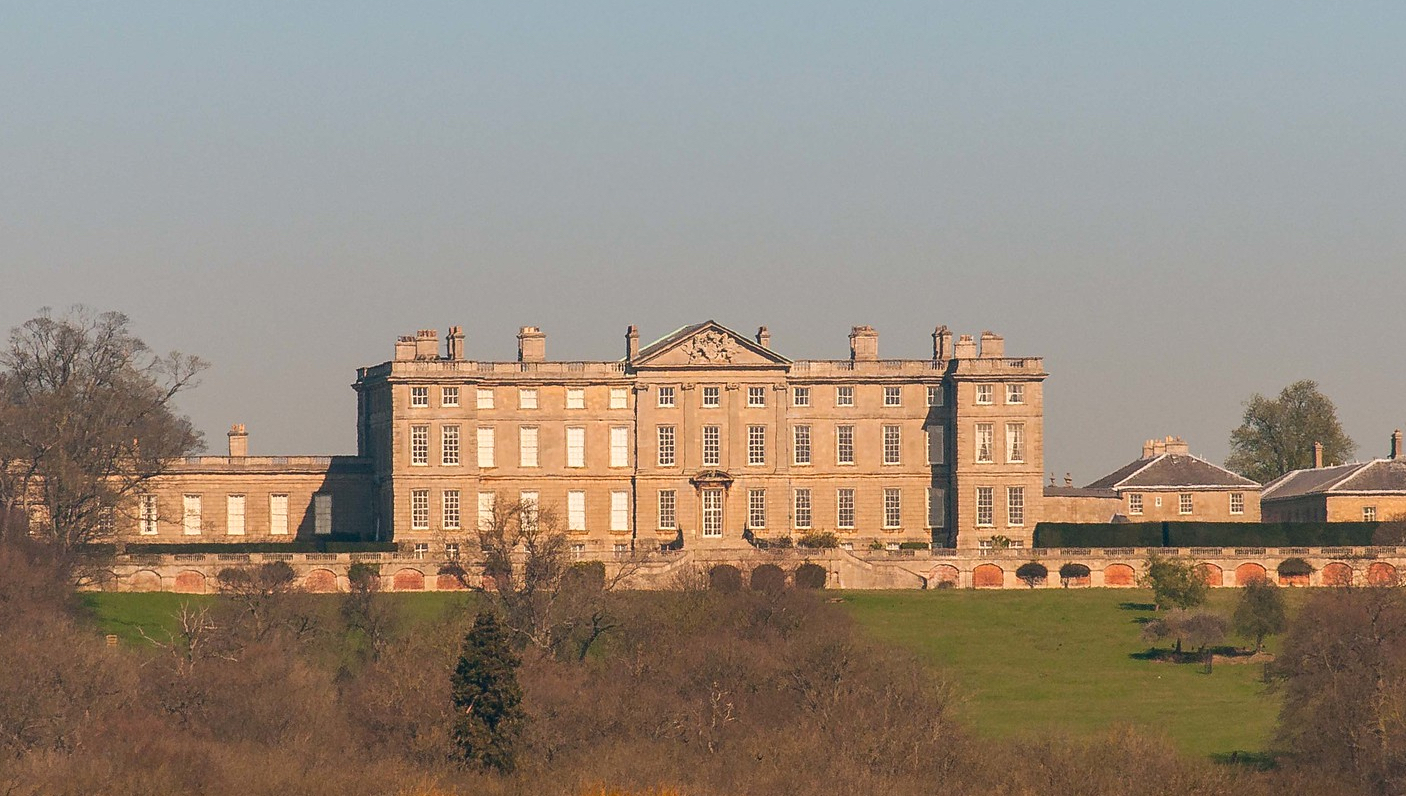
The Earl of Nottingham Finch's coat of arms was put on the top arch of the house.

On the accession of King George I he was made Lord President of the Council but in 1716 he finally withdrew from office. On 9 September 1729, he succeeded to the title Earl of Winchilsea after his 2nd cousin John Finch, 6th Earl of Winchilsea died unmarried. Nottingham was reluctant to receive the superior title due to his own familial pride with the Nottingham title, so he combined the title (henceforth became united with his paternal title of Earl of Nottingham). He died on 1 January 1730 Burley.

== Marriages and issue ==
He married twice:

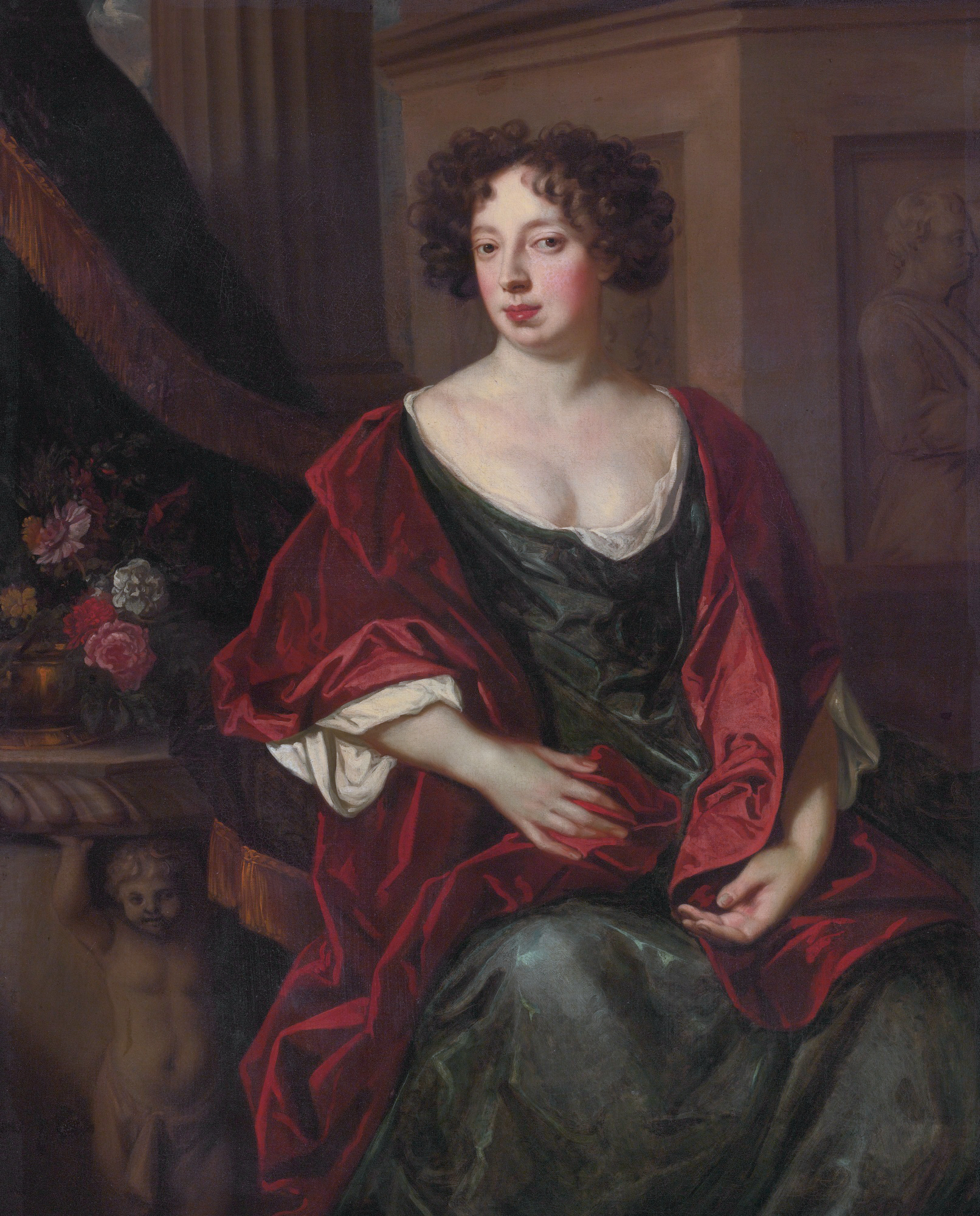
Lady Essex Rich, portrait by studio of Peter Lely

- Firstly, on 16 June 1674, to Lady Essex Rich, a daughter of Robert Rich, 3rd Earl of Warwick by his wife Anne Cheeke. By his first wife he had 8 children of whom only one daughter survived to adulthood:
  - Lady Mary Finch (born 1677), who married firstly William Savile, 2nd Marquess of Halifax (as his second wife), and secondly John Ker, 1st Duke of Roxburghe. had issues including Dorothy Savile, Countess of Burlington.

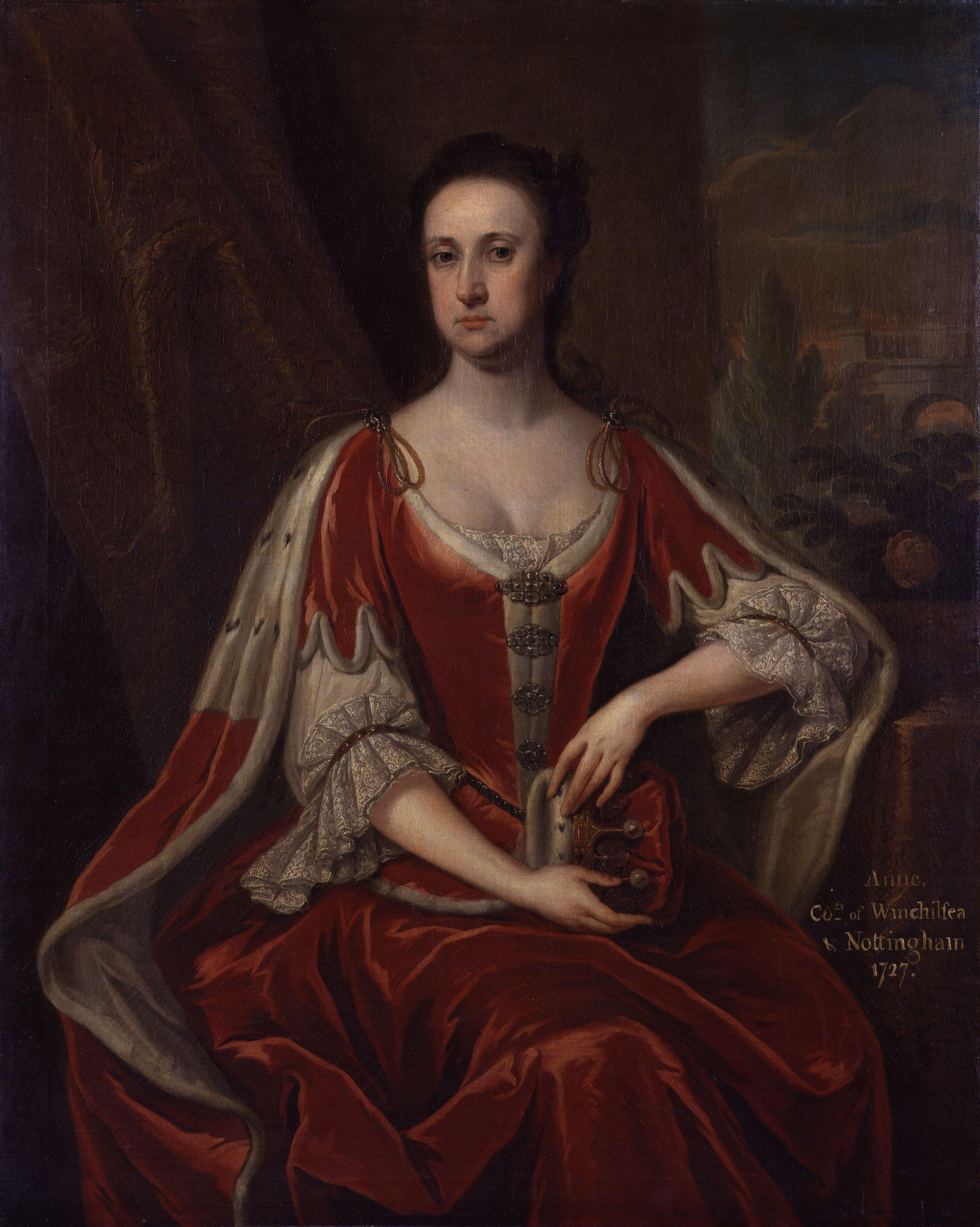
Portrait of Anne Hatton by Jonathan Richardson, circa 1726

- Secondly, on 29 December 1685, to Hon. Anne Hatton (1668–1743), a daughter of Christopher Hatton, 1st Viscount Hatton and Lady Cecilia Tufton, daughter of 2nd Earl of Thanet. She was appointed a Lady of the Bedchamber to Queen Mary II in 1691. By his second wife (who had over twenty pregnancies) he had at least twelve surviving children, including:
  - Daniel Finch, 8th Earl of Winchilsea (24 May 1689 – 2 August 1769), eldest son and heir, who married firstly Lady Frances Feilding, a daughter of Basil Feilding, 4th Earl of Denbigh and secondly Mary Palmer, daughter and co-heiress of Sir Thomas Palmer, 4th Baronet of Wingham. He had four surviving daughters, but had no male heir.
  - William Finch (1690 – 25 December 1766), who married Lady Charlotte Finch (née Fermor), a royal governess and daughter of Thomas Fermor, 1st Earl of Pomfret, by whom he had issue including Sophia Finch and George Finch, 9th Earl of Winchilsea, who died unmarried.
  - John Finch (1692–1763), who left a daughter.
  - Lady Essex Finch (28 Feb 1687 – 23 May 1721), who in 1703 married Sir Roger Mostyn, 3rd Baronet of Mostyn. They were parents to Sir Thomas Mostyn, 4th Baronet of Mostyn and two other children.
  - Henry Finch (1694 – 26 April 1761), whose illegitimate daughter, Charlotte (died 5 April 1810), married Thomas Raikes, Governor of the Bank of England;
  - Edward Finch (1697 – 16 May 1771), a member of parliament, who married Anne Palmer, another daughter and co-heiress of Sir Thomas Palmer, 4th Baronet of Wingham. Had children. He later took the surname Finch-Hatton, his grandson was George Finch-Hatton, 10th Earl of Winchilsea and all future Earls of Winchilsea descended from this line.
  - Lady Charlotte Finch (1693 (?1711) – 21 January 1773), who in 1725 became the second wife of Charles Seymour, 6th Duke of Somerset, and was the mother of Lady Charlotte and Lady Frances Seymour.
  - Lady (Cecilia) Isabella Finch (1700–1771), who never married but became first Lady of the Bedchamber to Princess Amelia, a spinster aunt of King George III. In 1740 she commissioned William Kent to build her a magnificent townhouse at 44 Berkeley Square in Mayfair, London, which is famed for its theatrical staircase. It was purchased after her death by William Henry Fortescue, 1st Earl of Clermont (1722–1806), and served as his London townhouse. In the 20th century it was used as the Clermont Club.
  - Lady Mary Finch (1701 – 30 May 1761) (not to be confused with her elder half-sister), who in 1716 married Thomas Watson-Wentworth, 1st Marquess of Rockingham.
  - Lady Henrietta Finch (1702 – 14 April 1742), who in 1723 married William Fitzroy, 3rd Duke of Cleveland. No known descendants.
  - Lady Elizabeth Finch (1704 – 10 April 1784), who married William Murray, 1st Earl of Mansfield. No descendants, but helped raised Dido Belle and Lady Elizabeth Murray.

== Assessment by Macaulay ==
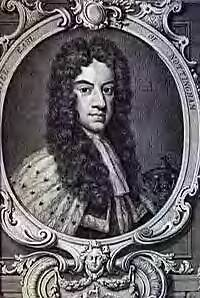
Daniel Finch, 2nd Earl of Nottingham, 1747, by Jacobus Houbraken

The Whig historian Lord Macaulay said of Lord Nottingham in 1848:

This son, Earl Daniel, was an honourable and virtuous man. Though enslaved by some absurd prejudices, and though liable to strange fits of caprice, he cannot be accused of having deviated from the path of right in search either of unlawful gain or of unlawful pleasure. Like his father he was a distinguished speaker, impressive, but prolix, and too monotonously solemn. The person of the orator was in perfect harmony with his oratory. His attitude was rigidly erect: his complexion so dark that he might have passed for a native of a warmer climate than ours; and his harsh features were composed to an expression resembling that of a chief mourner at a funeral. It was commonly said that he looked rather like a Spanish grandee than like an English gentleman. The nicknames of Dismal, Don Dismallo, and Don Diego, were fastened on him by jesters, and are not yet forgotten. He had paid much attention to the science by which his family had been raised to greatness, and was, for a man born to rank and wealth, wonderfully well read in the laws of his country. He was a devoted son of the Church, and showed his respect for her in two ways not usual among those Lords who in his time boasted that they were her especial friends, by writing tracts in defence of her dogmas, and by shaping his private life according to her precepts. Like other zealous churchmen, he had, till recently, been a strenuous supporter of monarchical authority. But to the policy which had been pursued since the suppression of the Western insurrection he was bitterly hostile, and not the less so because his younger brother Heneage had been turned out of the office of Solicitor General for refusing to defend the King's dispensing power.

== Notes ==
Parliament of England
Preceded by Henry Clerke; John Trevor	Member of Parliament for Great Bedwyn; 1673–1679; With: Henry Clerke	Succeeded by Francis Stonehouse; John Deane
Preceded by Sir Henry Lyttelton, Bt; Sir Michael Biddulph, Bt	Member of Parliament for Lichfield; 1679–1682; With: Sir Michael Biddulph, Bt	Succeeded by Thomas Orme; Richard Leveson
Preceded by Sir John Holmes; Lemuel Kingdon	Member of Parliament for Newtown; 1681–1682; With: Sir John Holmes	Succeeded by Thomas Done; William Blathwayt
Political offices
Preceded by Sir Henry Capell	First Lord of the Admiralty; 1681–1684	Succeeded by King Charles II (Lord High Admiral)
Preceded by The Viscount Preston	Secretary of State for the Northern Department; 1689–1690	Succeeded by The Viscount Sydney of Sheppey
Preceded by The Earl of Shrewsbury	Secretary of State for the Southern Department; 1690–1693	Succeeded by Sir John Trenchard
Preceded by The Viscount Sydney of Sheppey	Secretary of State for the Northern Department; 1692–1693	Succeeded by Sir John Trenchard
Preceded by The Earl of Manchester	Secretary of State for the Southern Department; 1702–1704	Succeeded by Sir Charles Hedges
Preceded by The Duke of Buckingham and Normanby	Lord President of the Council; 1714–1716	Succeeded by The Duke of Devonshire
Honorary titles
Preceded by Henry Compton	Senior Privy Counsellor; 1713–1730	Succeeded by The Earl of Peterborough and Monmouth
Peerage of England
Preceded by John Finch	Earl of Winchilsea; 1729–1730	Succeeded by Daniel Finch
Preceded by Heneage Finch	Earl of Nottingham; 7th creation 1682–1730	Succeeded by Daniel Finch
