= Anne Finch, Countess of Nottingham =

The Right Honourable The Countess of Winchilsea and Nottingham
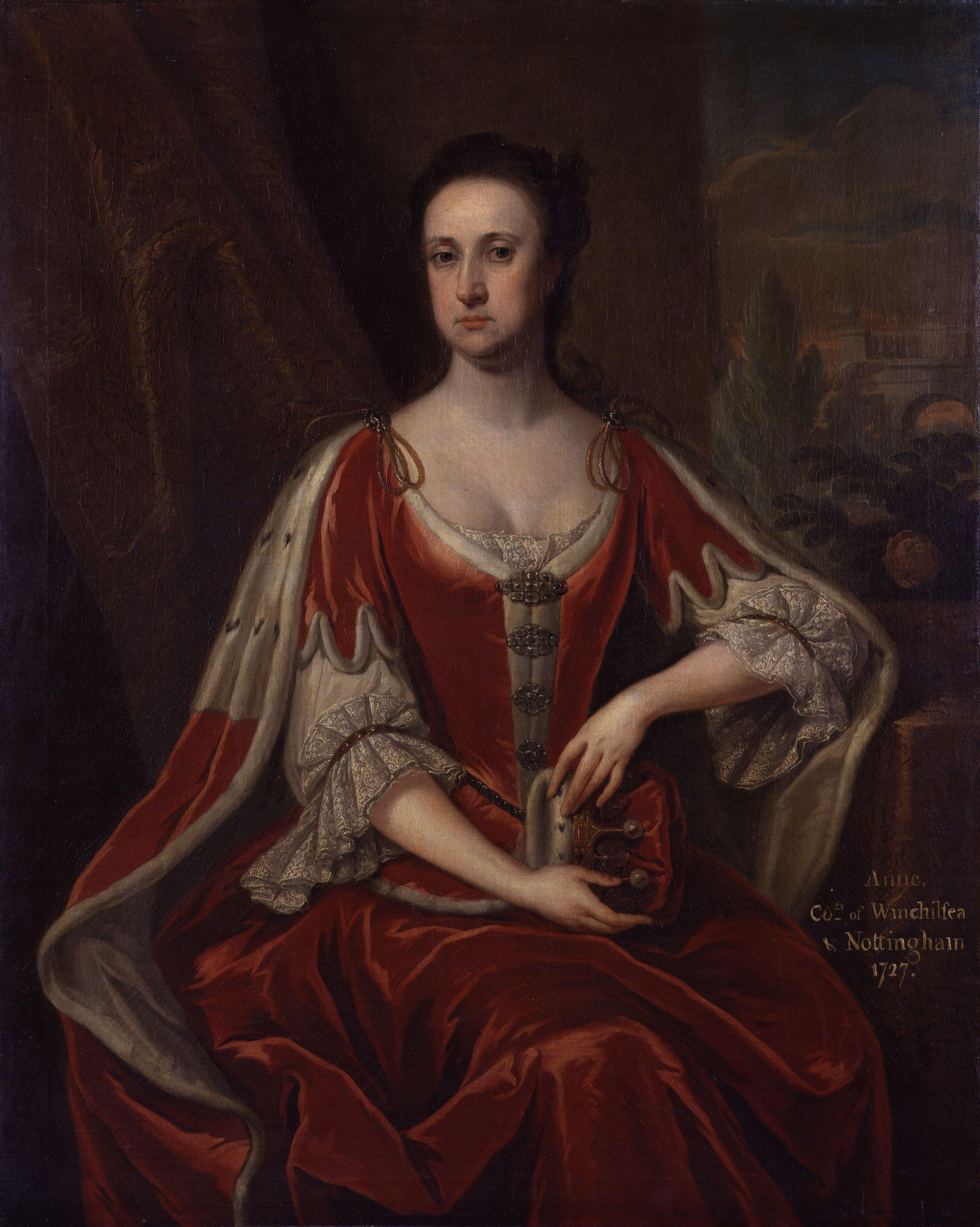
- Portrait of Anne by Jonathan Richardson, c. 1726
- Born: Hon. Anne Hatton; October 1668
- Died: 26 September 1743 (aged 74)
- Spouse: Daniel Finch, 2nd Earl of Nottingham (after 1685)
- Children: at least 13, including: Daniel Finch; William Finch; Edward Finch; Charlotte Finch
- Parent(s): Christopher Hatton, 1st Viscount Hatton; Lady Cecilia Tufton

Anne Finch, Countess of Winchilsea and Nottingham (née Hatton; October 1668 – 26 September 1743), formerly Anne Hatton, was daughter of Christopher Hatton, 1st Viscount Hatton and the second wife of Daniel Finch, 2nd Earl of Nottingham, and the mother of Daniel Finch, 8th Earl of Winchilsea. Lady Nottingham was appointed the Lady of the Bedchamber to Mary II of England in 1691, and served in that position until the Queen's death in 1694.

== Early life ==
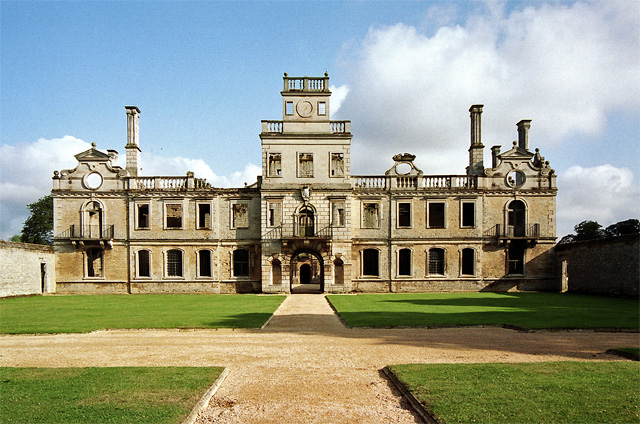
Kirby Hall, Northamptonshire (seat of the Hattons)

Anne was the daughter of Christopher Hatton, 1st Viscount Hatton, and his wife, the former Lady Cecilia Tufton. During an explosion at Castle Cornet on 30 December 1672, her mother and grandmother were killed, while she and her young sisters were rescued from the rubble by her father's black servant, James Chappell.

From her father's second marriage, she had two younger half-brothers, William Hatton, 2nd Viscount Hatton and Henry Hatton, 3rd Viscount Hatton.

Her father, the 1st Viscount Hatton was the son of Christopher Hatton, 1st Baron Hatton and the former Elizabeth Montagu (daughter of Sir Charles Montagu, she was killed in the castle explosion).

Her mother, Lady Cecilia Tufton was the fourth daughter of John Tufton, 2nd Earl of Thanet and Lady Margaret Sackville (eldest daughter and sole heiress of Richard Sackville, 3rd Earl of Dorset and Lady Anne Clifford, Baroness Clifford). Anne was presumably named after her great grandmother Lady Anne Clifford (1590-1676) who was alive when she was born.

While at court, some of the court ladies were shocked by Lady Nottingham's extreme show of religious gesture while praying in the royal chapel.

== Personal life ==
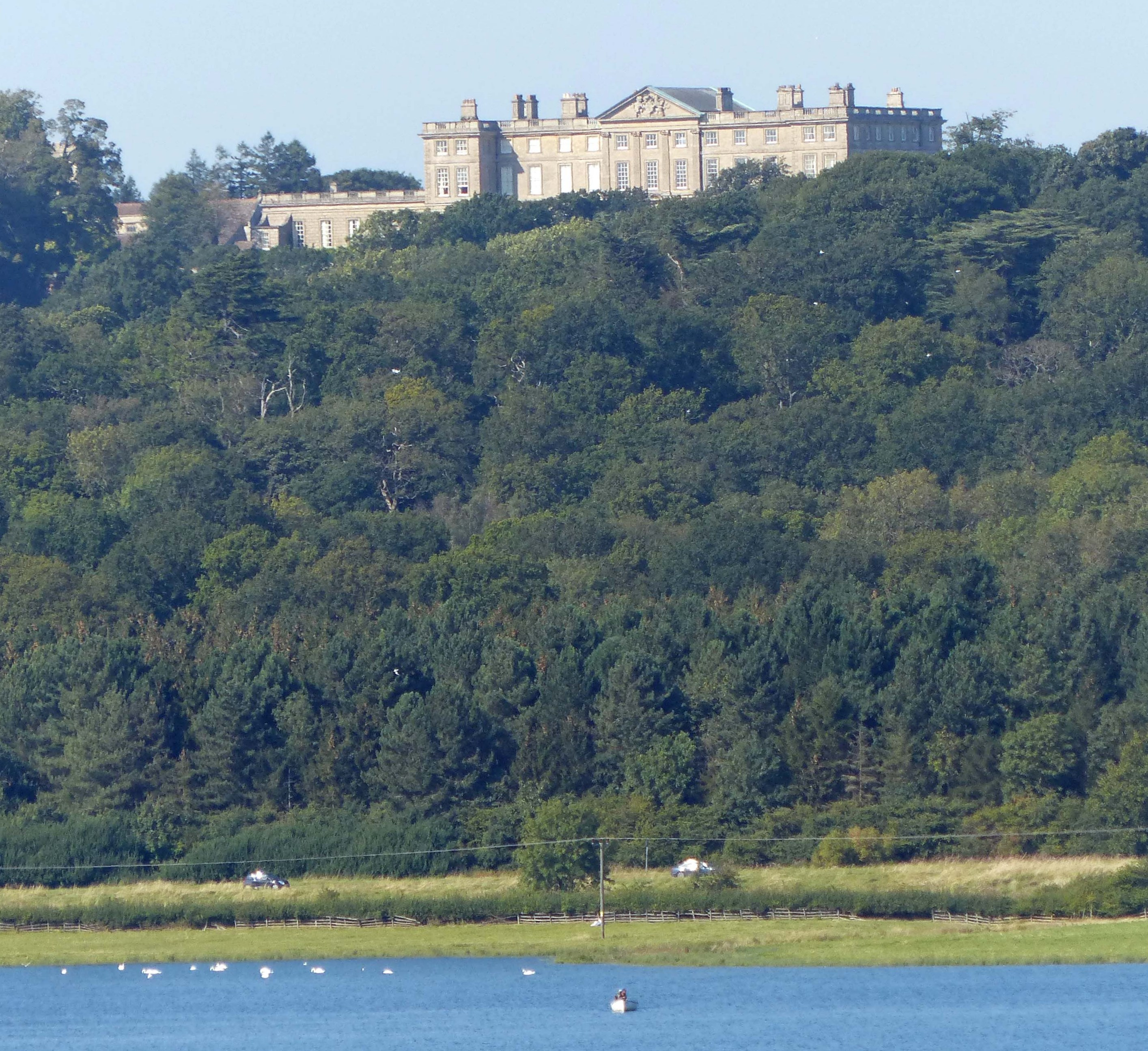
Burley on the hill House, Rutland. (Built by her husband, the site was chosen by him to be closer to his wife's family, the Hattons at Kirby).

On 29 December 1685, she was married to Daniel Finch, 2nd Earl of Nottingham (later also 7th Earl of Winchilsea), who was more than twenty years her senior. The earl's first wife, the former Lady Essex Rich, who was her distant cousin died in childbirth in 1684, leaving one surviving daughter (Lady Mary Finch, who married William Savile, 2nd Marquess of Halifax and John Ker, 1st Duke of Roxburghe). From Anne's twenty-two pregnancies, the couple had at least thirteen surviving children, including:

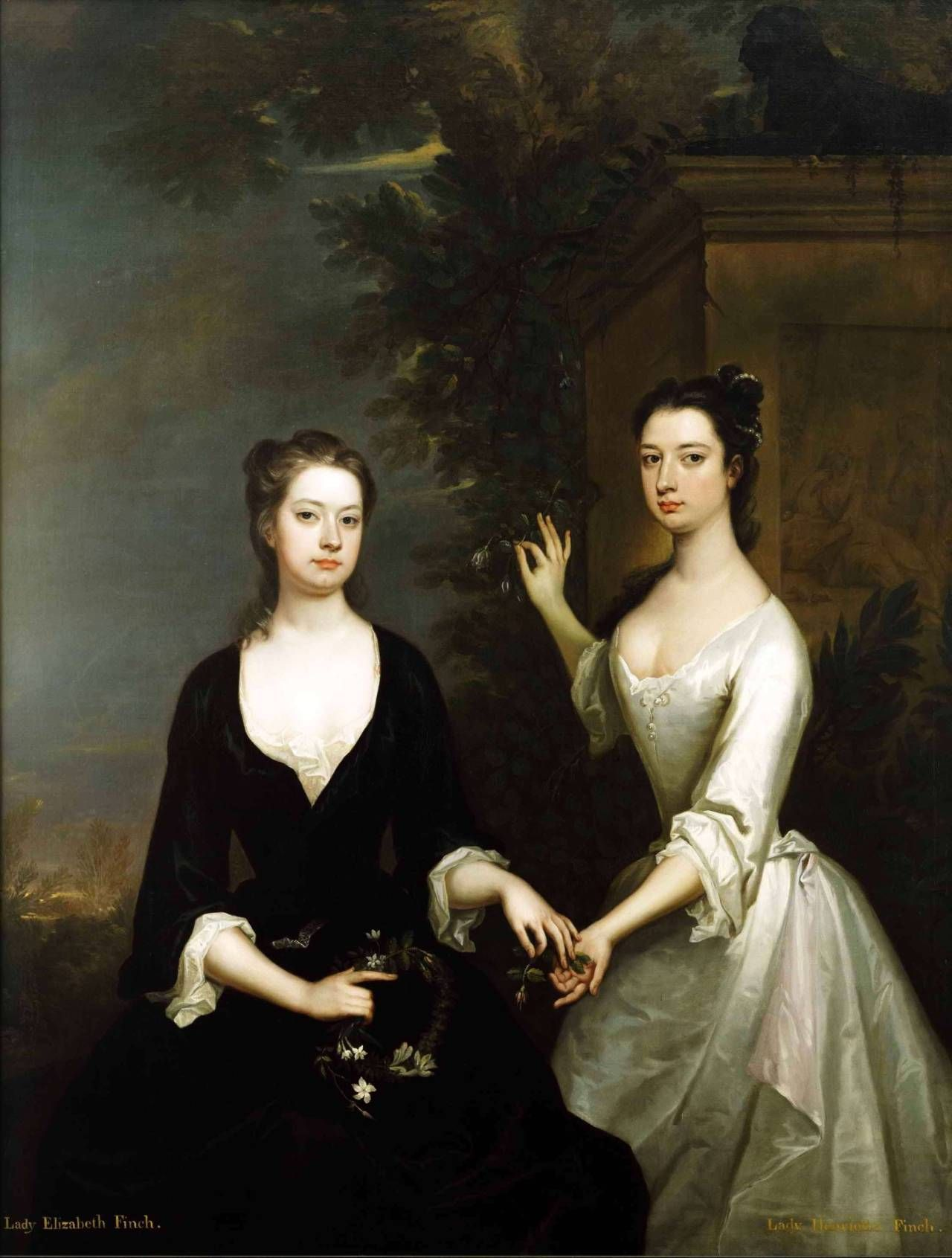
Her youngest daughters, Elizabeth (later Countess of Mansfield) and Henrietta, Duchess of Cleveland.

1. Lady Essex Finch (1687–1721), who married Sir Roger Mostyn, 3rd Baronet of Mostyn, and had children include Essex, Duchess of Roxburghe.
2. Daniel Finch, 8th Earl of Winchilsea (1689–1769), who was married twice, first to Lady Frances Feilding, and second to Mary Palmer, but had no sons.
3. William Finch (1690–1766), who married Charlotte Fermor, and was the father of George Finch, 9th Earl of Winchilsea.
4. John Finch (1692–1763), who had one illegitimate daughter, whose presentation at court in 1747 created controversy.
5. Lady Charlotte Finch (1693–1773), who married Charles Seymour, 6th Duke of Somerset, and had Charlotte (later Countess of Aylesford) and Frances Seymour (later Marchioness of Granby).
6. Henry Finch (1694–1761), whose illegitimate daughter, Charlotte (d. 5 April 1810), married Thomas Raikes, Governor of the Bank of England.
7. Edward Finch (1697–1771), who became a diplomat and married Anne Palmer. He later took the surname Finch-Hatton, and was the grandfather of George Finch-Hatton, 10th Earl of Winchilsea.
8. Lady (Cecilia) Isabella Finch (1700–1771), who never married but became first Lady of the Bedchamber to Princess Amelia, and was the owner of 44 Berkeley Square in Mayfair, London.
9. Lady Mary Finch (1701–1761) (not to be confused with her elder half-sister of the same name from her father's first marriage), who married Thomas Watson-Wentworth, 1st Marquess of Rockingham, and had children include 2nd Marquess of Rockingham and Countess Fitzwilliam.
10. Lady Henrietta Finch (1702–1742), who married William Fitzroy, 3rd Duke of Cleveland, and had no children
11. Lady Elizabeth Finch (1704–1784), who married William Murray, 1st Earl of Mansfield, and had no children

Lady Nottingham died on 26 September 1743.

== Ancestry ==
Ancestors of Anne Hatton

16. John Hatton of Longstanton
8. Sir Christopher Hatton
17. Jane Shute
4. Christopher Hatton, 1st Baron Hatton
18. Thomas Fanshawe
9. Alice Fanshawe
19. Joan Smith
2. Christopher Hatton, 1st Viscount Hatton
20. Edward Montagu of Boughton
10. Sir Charles Montagu (of Boughton)
21. Elizabeth Harington
5. Elizabeth Montagu
22. Sir William Whitmore
11. Mary Whitmore
23. Anne Bond
Anne Hatton, Countess of Nottingham
24. Sir John Tufton, 1st Baronet
12. Nicholas Tufton, 1st Earl of Thanet
25. Christian Browne
6. John Tufton, 2nd Earl of Thanet
26. Thomas Cecil, 1st Earl of Exeter, Lord Burghley
13. Lady Frances Cecil
27. Hon. Dorothy Neville
3. Lady Cecily Tufton
28. Robert Sackville, 2nd Earl of Dorset
14. Richard Sackville, 3rd Earl of Dorset
29. Lady Margaret Howard
7. Lady Margaret Sackville
30. George Clifford, 3rd Earl of Cumberland
15. Lady Anne Clifford
31. Lady Margaret Russell
