= Henrietta Louisa Fermor =

British noble (1698-1761)

The Right Honourable The Countess of Pomfret
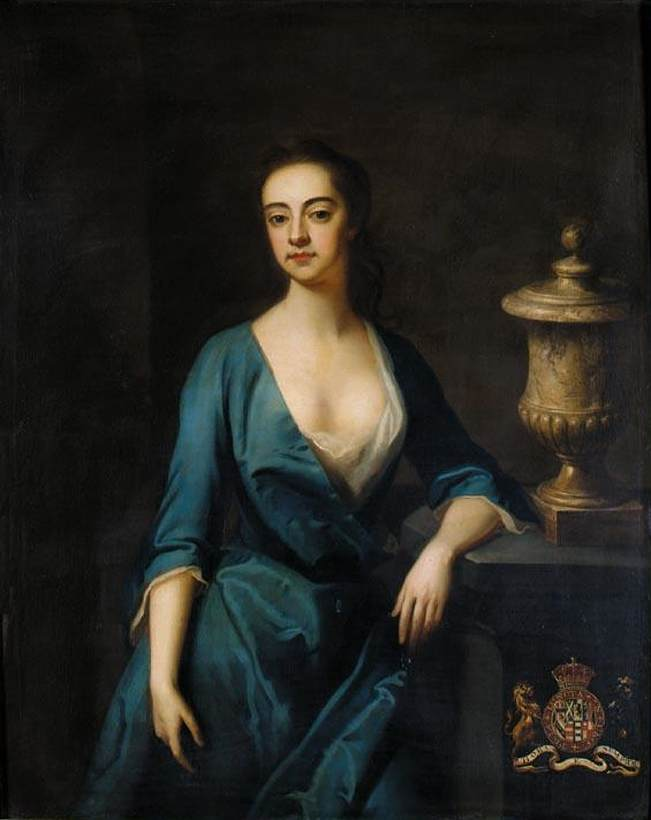
- Portrait of Henrietta Louisa Jeffreys by Enoch Seeman
- Born: 19 November 1698
- Died: 16 December 1761 (aged 63)
- Spouse: Thomas Fermor, 1st Earl of Pomfret
- Issue: George Fermor, 2nd Earl of Pomfret; Lady Charlotte Finch; Lady Sophia Frances Fermor; Lady Juliana Fermor Penn; Lady Anne Fermor
- Father: John Jeffreys, 2nd Baron Jeffreys of Wem, Shropshire
- Mother: Lady Charlotte Herbert

Henrietta Louisa Fermor, Countess of Pomfret (née Jeffreys; 15 November 1698 – 15 December 1787), was an English letter writer.

== Life ==
She was born in 1698 in Leicester Square, London, the only surviving child of John Jeffreys, 2nd Baron Jeffreys of Wem, Shropshire, by his wife, Lady Charlotte Herbert, daughter and heiress of Philip, Earl of Pembroke and Montgomery (by his wife, Henriette de Kérouaille, sister of Charles II's mistress Louise, Duchess of Portsmouth).

On 14 July 1720, Lady Henrietta Louisa Jeffreys married Thomas Fermor, 2nd Baron Leominster, who in the following year was created Earl of Pomfret, or Pontefract, Yorkshire. He was afterwards elected a K.B., and in September 1727 was appointed master of the horse to Queen Caroline, to whom also Lady Pomfret was one of the ladies of the bedchamber. In 1730, Jeffreys compiled a collection of prints into an album titled "Heads, English & foreign collected by Henrietta Louisa Jeffreys, countess of Pomfret", now held at Queen's University Kingston. On the death of the queen in November 1737 Lady Pomfret, with her friend Frances, countess of Hertford, retired from court. In September 1738 she and her husband made a three years' tour in France and Italy. At Florence, where they arrived on 20 December 1739, they were visited by Horace Walpole and Lady Mary Wortley Montagu. They soon afterwards returned to England by way of Bologna, Venice, Augsburg, Frankfort and Brussels, reaching home in October 1741. At the Duchess of Norfolk's masquerade in the following February the pair "trudged in like pilgrims, with vast staffs in their hands!"

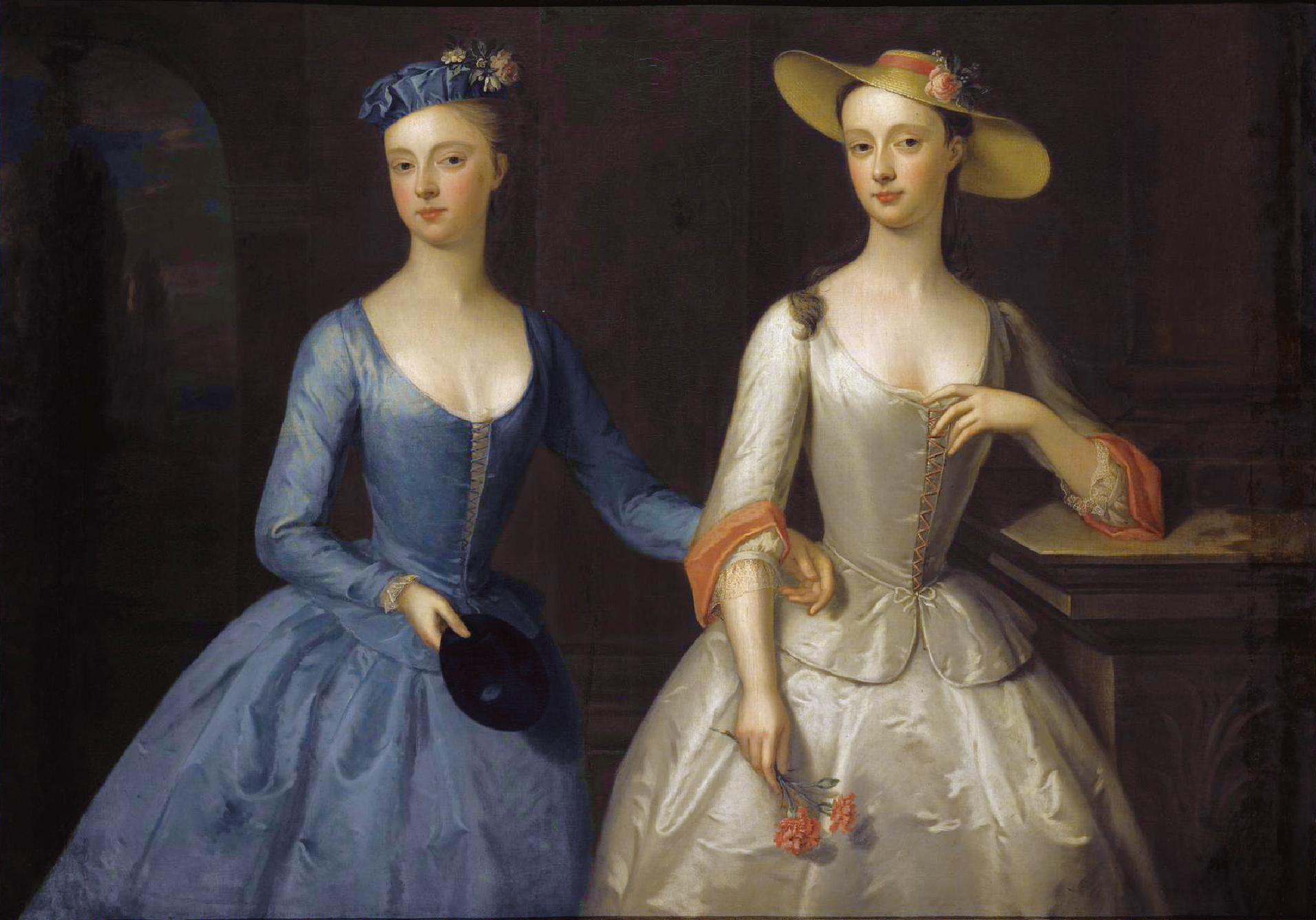
Sophia and Charlotte Fermor, two of her six daughters (the former became the second wife of John Carteret, 2nd Earl Granville, a man much older than herself; the latter wed the diplomat William Finch).

Lord Pomfret died 8 July 1753, and was succeeded by his eldest son, George. The son's extravagance obliged him to sell the furniture of his seat at Easton Neston, Northamptonshire. His statues, which had been part of the Arundelian collection, and had been purchased by his grandfather, were bought by his mother for presentation to the University of Oxford. A letter of thanks, enclosed in a silver box, was presented to her by the university, 25 February 1755, and a poem in her honour was published at Oxford in the following year.

Lady Pomfret died on the road to Bath 15 December 1761, leaving a family of four sons and six daughters. She was buried at Easton Neston, but a neat cenotaph was afterwards erected to her memory in St. Mary's Church, Oxford.

Horace Walpole mocked Lady Pomfret, speaking of her "paltry air of significant learning and absurdity", and saying she was utterly devoid of humour. She considered "that Swift would have written better if he had never written ludicrously." Another satirical friend, Lady M. W. Montagu, found in Lady Pomfret's letters all the pleasure of an agreeable author. Lady Bute came into possession of the letters. Three volumes of Correspondence between Frances Countess of Hartford (afterwards Duchess of Somerset), and Henrietta Louisa, Countess of Pomfret, between … 1738 and 1741, were published at London in 1805, and again in 1806, by William Bingley, at the desire of Mrs. Burslem of Imber House, Wiltshire, to whom the originals belonged. Prefixed to vol. i. is an engraved portrait of Lady Pomfret from the original picture in crayons by Caroline Watson.
