= George Finch, 9th Earl of Winchilsea =

English peer, army officer and cricketer (1752–1826)

The Right Honourable The Earl of Winchilsea KG PC FRS
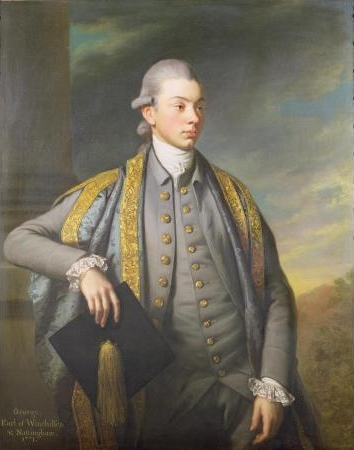

Lord Lieutenant of Rutland
- In office 12 April 1779 – 2 August 1826
- Preceded by: The Earl of Exeter
- Succeeded by: The Marquess of Exeter

Personal details
- Born: George Finch; 4 November 1752
- Died: 2 August 1826 (aged 73)
- Children: George Finch (Illegitimate)
- Parents: William Finch; Charlotte Fermor
- Relatives: Anne Hatton (Grandmother); Daniel Finch, 7th Earl of Winchilsea (Grandfather)

George Finch, 9th Earl of Winchilsea KG PC FRS (4 November 1752 – 2 August 1826), was an English peer, army officer and cricketer who was an important figure in the history of cricket. His main contributions to the game were patronage and organisation but Winchilsea, an amateur, was also a very keen player. Finch was appointed to command the Rutland Militia in 1778 at the time of the American Revolutionary War, but transferred to the 87th Foot from its formation in 1779 to its disbanding in 1783, with the temporary ranks of major and lieutenant-colonel. Finch was the first president of the Royal Institution, and it was through his influence that it received the endorsement of King George III.

== Early life ==
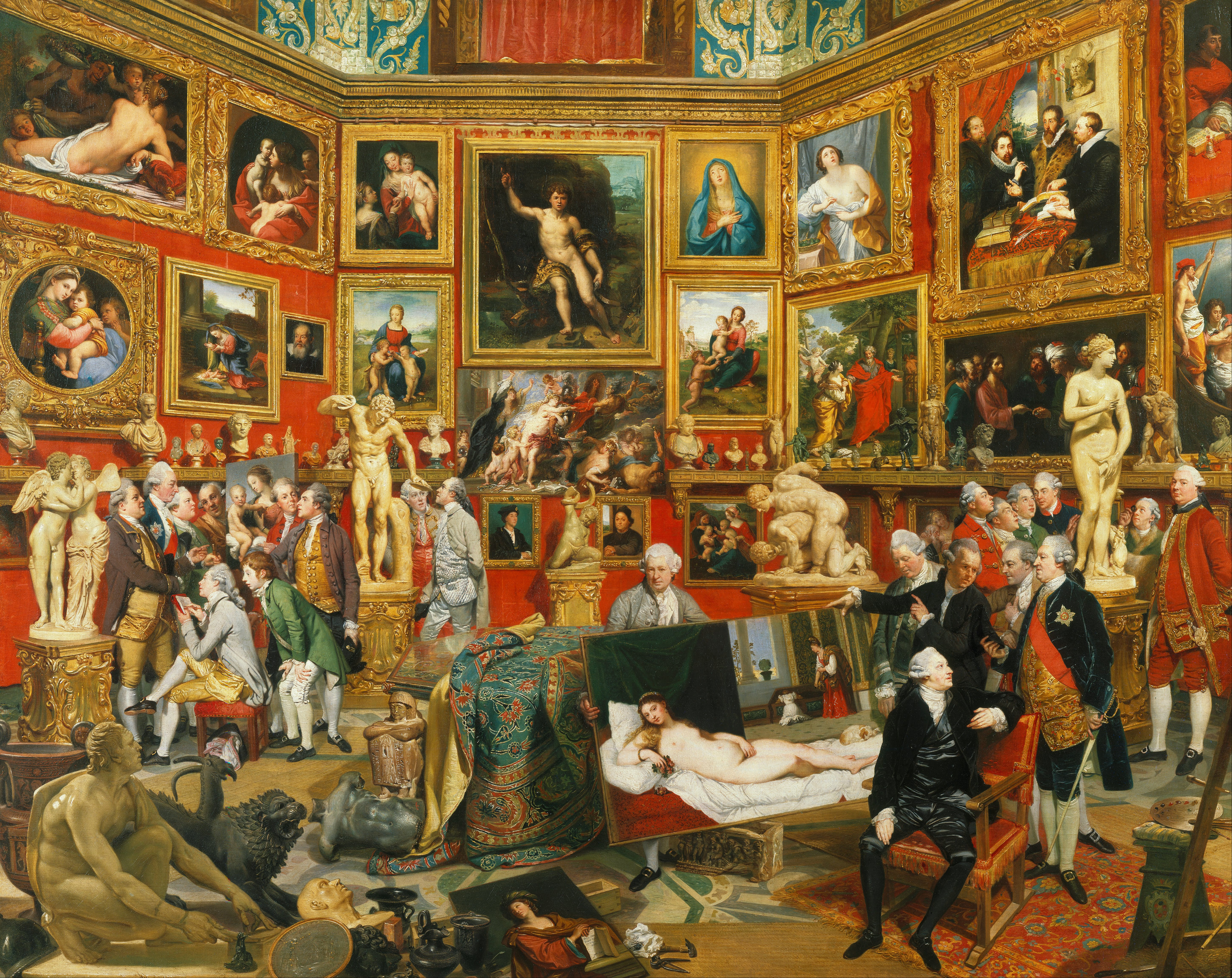
The Tribuna of the Uffizi (he was the one in red at the far right looking at the statue).

Finch was the son of Hon. William Finch, second son of Anne Hatton and Daniel Finch, 2nd Earl of Nottingham (1647–1730), by his wife Charlotte Fermor, daughter of Thomas Fermor, 1st Earl of Pomfret. His sister was Sophia Finch.

In the 1770s Finch was in Florence and appears as one of the recognisable people on the right-hand team of Johann Zoffany's painting the Tribuna of the Uffizi.

He became the next Earl of Winchilsea in 1769 when his uncle, Daniel Finch, 8th Earl of Winchilsea and 3rd Earl of Nottingham who had no male heir died, he also inherited the Burley House estate and ancestral seat at Burley-on-the-Hill, Rutland.

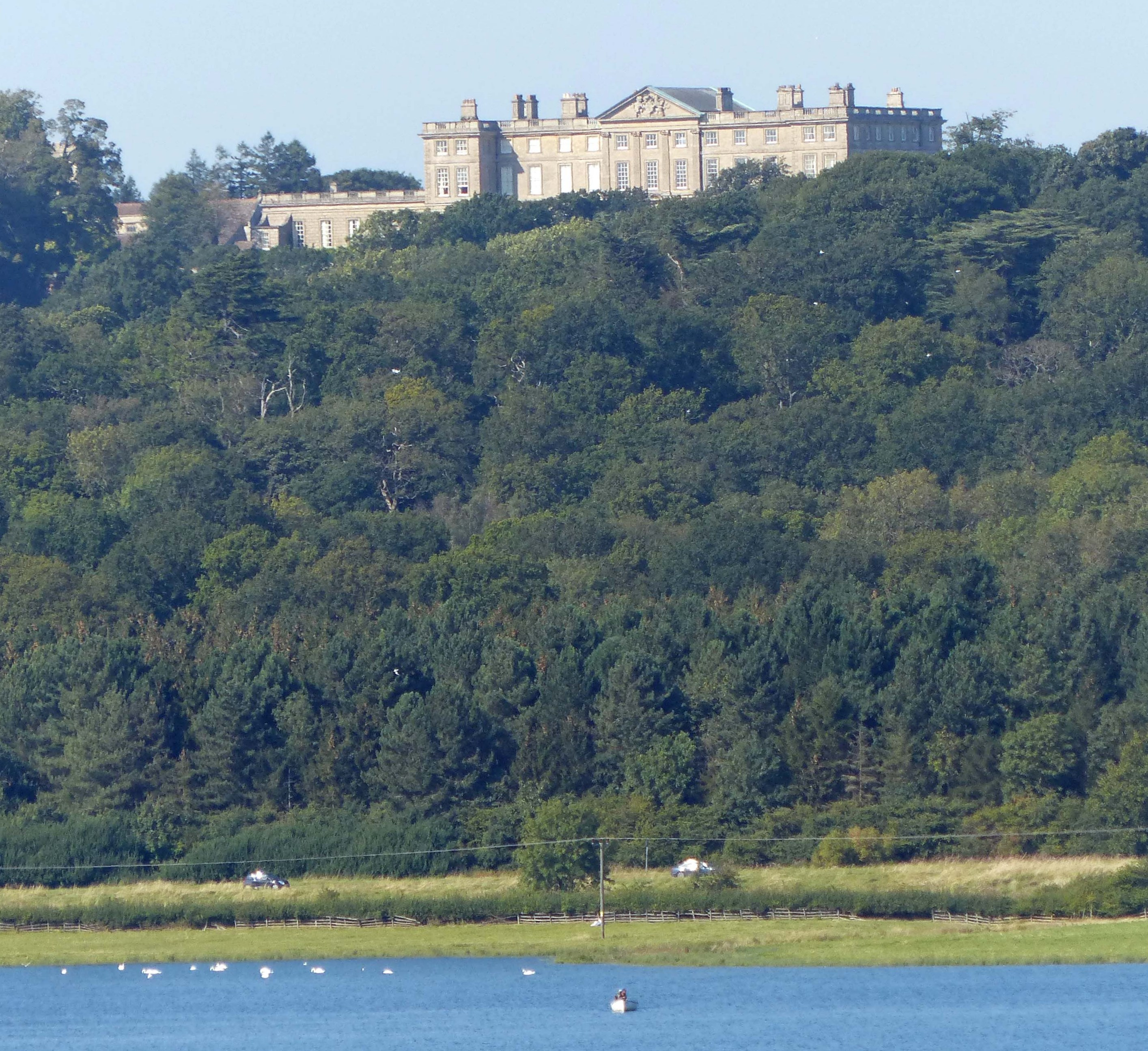
Burley House viewed from Rutland Water, the seat of the 7th, 8th, 9th Earl of Winchilsea and Nottingham.

== Cricketer ==
A. A. Thomson wrote that Winchilsea "would go anywhere for a game of cricket." He was certainly prolific and is one of the most recorded players of the 18th century, though he was far from being among the best and was already 33 when he was first recorded in a senior match. He is known to have played in at least 128 important matches between 1786 and 1804, and records of many other matches have certainly been lost. His level of activity is matched by few of his contemporaries; only Billy Beldham and Tom Walker made a substantially greater number of appearances. Lord Frederick Beauclerk and George Louch were the only amateurs of the time as prolific as Winchilsea, but they were much better players because Winchilsea on the field was something of a liability. His known career batting average was a lowly single figure, despite using a bat that weighed 4 lb 2 oz.

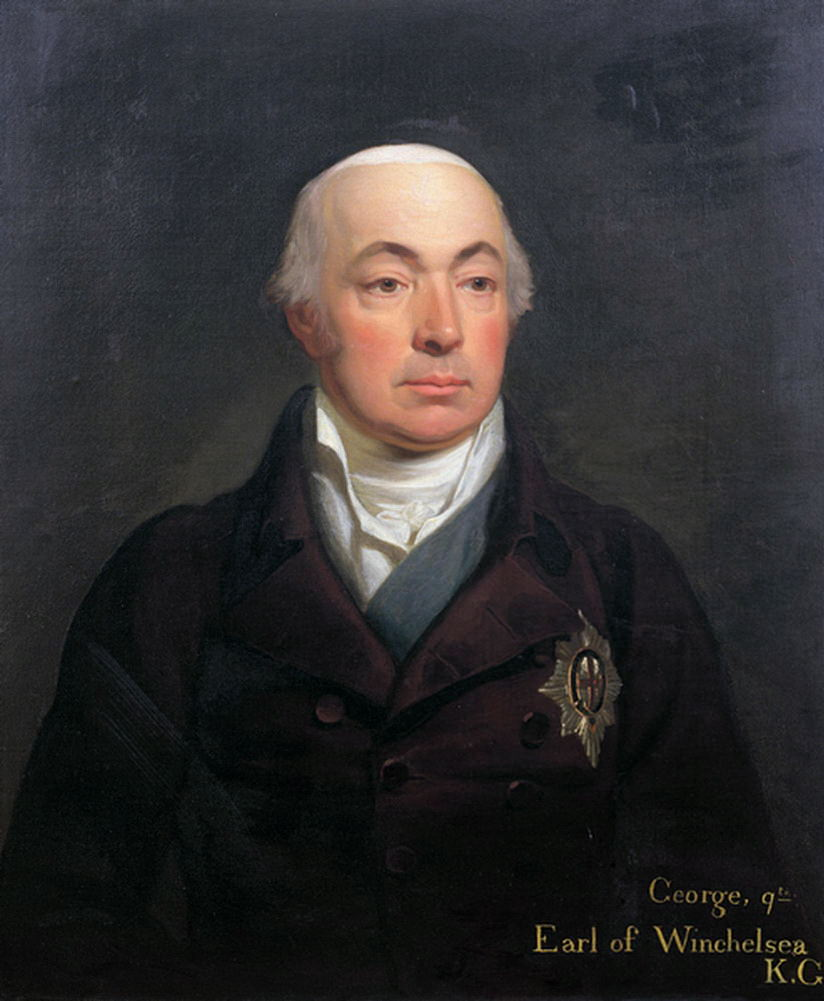
George Finch, 9th Earl of Winchilsea by William Beechey

In about 1784, Winchilsea was one of the prime movers in the foundation of the White Conduit Club (WCC), so–called because it played on White Conduit Fields. This was ostensibly an exclusive club that "only gentlemen" might play for, but the club did employ professionals and one of these was the bowler Thomas Lord, a man who was recognised for his business acumen as well as his bowling ability. It was in 1785 that the club first appeared in a historically important match. White Conduit Fields was an open area allowing members of the public, including the rowdier elements, to watch the matches and to voice their opinions on the play and the players. The White Conduit gentlemen were not amused by such interruptions and decided to look for a more private venue of their own.

Winchilsea and Colonel Charles Lennox commissioned Lord to find a new ground and offered him a guarantee against any losses he may suffer in the venture. Lord took a lease from the Portman Estate on some land at Dorset Fields in Marylebone, where Dorset Square is now sited; the ground was prepared and opened in 1787. The first known match began on Monday, 21 May 1787 and was between the White Conduit Club and Middlesex. This was Lord's first ground, originally called the New Ground and, since it was in Marylebone, the WCC on relocating there decided to call themselves Marylebone Cricket Club (MCC). The Earl of Winchilsea was one of its early leading lights.

== Personal life ==
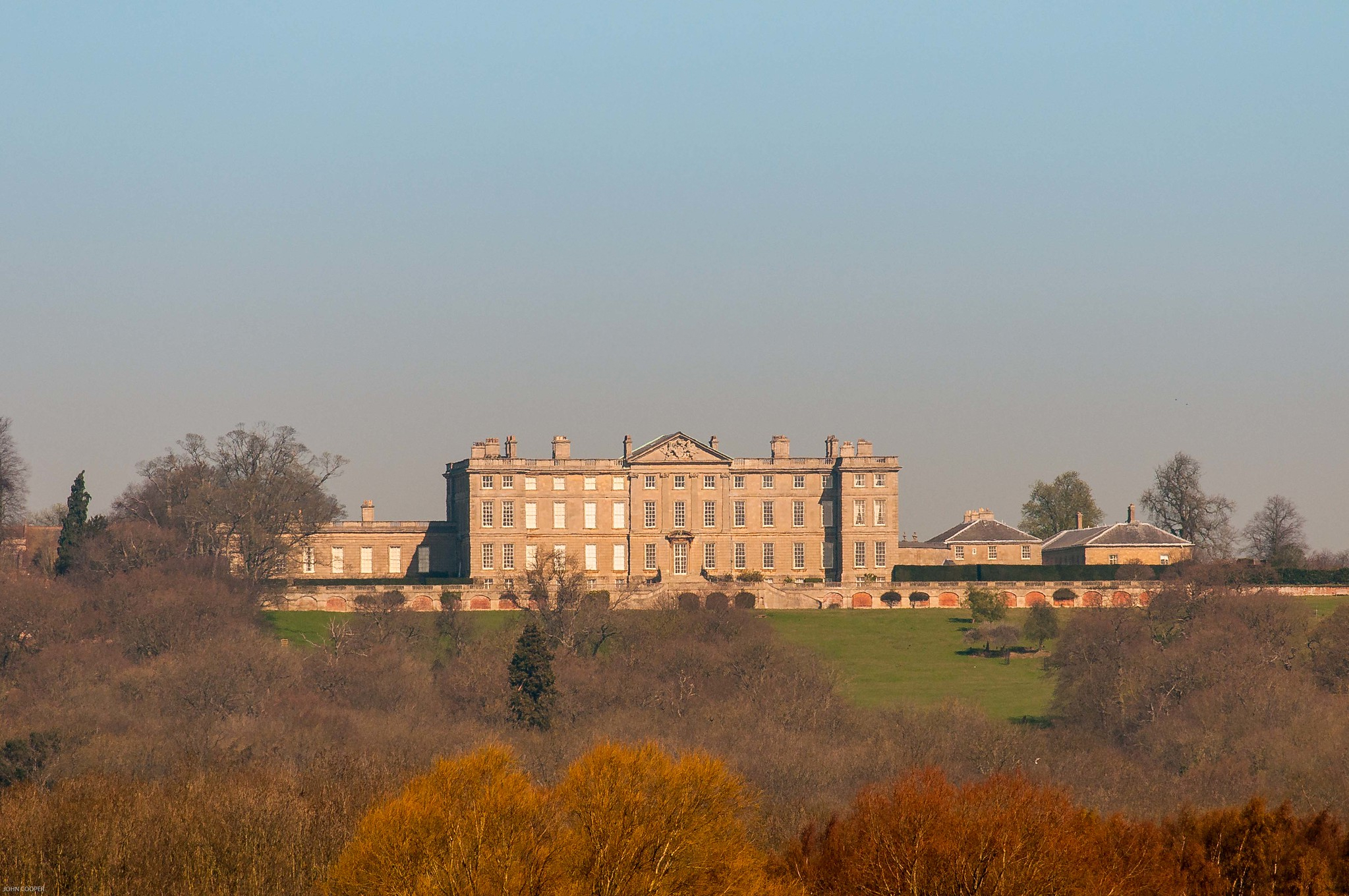
Burley House, Rutland

Lord Winchilsea never married and died in 1826. His titles passed to his first cousin's son George William Finch-Hatton, 10th Earl of Winchilsea. His illegitimate son George Finch, to whom he left Burley House, became a politician.

== Sources ==
- Buckley, G. B. (FL18): Fresh Light on 18th Century Cricket.
- Haygarth, Arthur (SBnnn): Scores & Biographies, Volume 1.
- Maj C.A. Markham, The History of the Northamptonshire and Rutland Militia, Now the 3rd Battalion (Militia) of The Northamptonshire Regiment, from 1756 to 1919, London: Reeves & Turner, 1924.
- Mote, Ashley (GDC): The Glory Days of Cricket.
- Mote, Ashley: John Nyren's "The Cricketers of my Time".
- Thomson, Arthur Alexander: Odd Men In: A Gallery of Cricket Eccentrics (The Pavilion Library, 1985).
- Waghorn, H. T. (WDC): The Dawn of Cricket.

Honorary titles
Preceded by The Earl of Exeter	Lord Lieutenant of Rutland; 1779–1826	Succeeded by The Marquess of Exeter
Peerage of England
Preceded by Daniel Finch	Earl of Winchilsea; 1769–1826	Succeeded by George Finch-Hatton
Preceded by Daniel Finch	Earl of Nottingham; 7th creation 1769–1826	Succeeded by George Finch-Hatton
