= Essex Finch, Countess of Nottingham =

The Right Honourable; The Countess of Nottingham
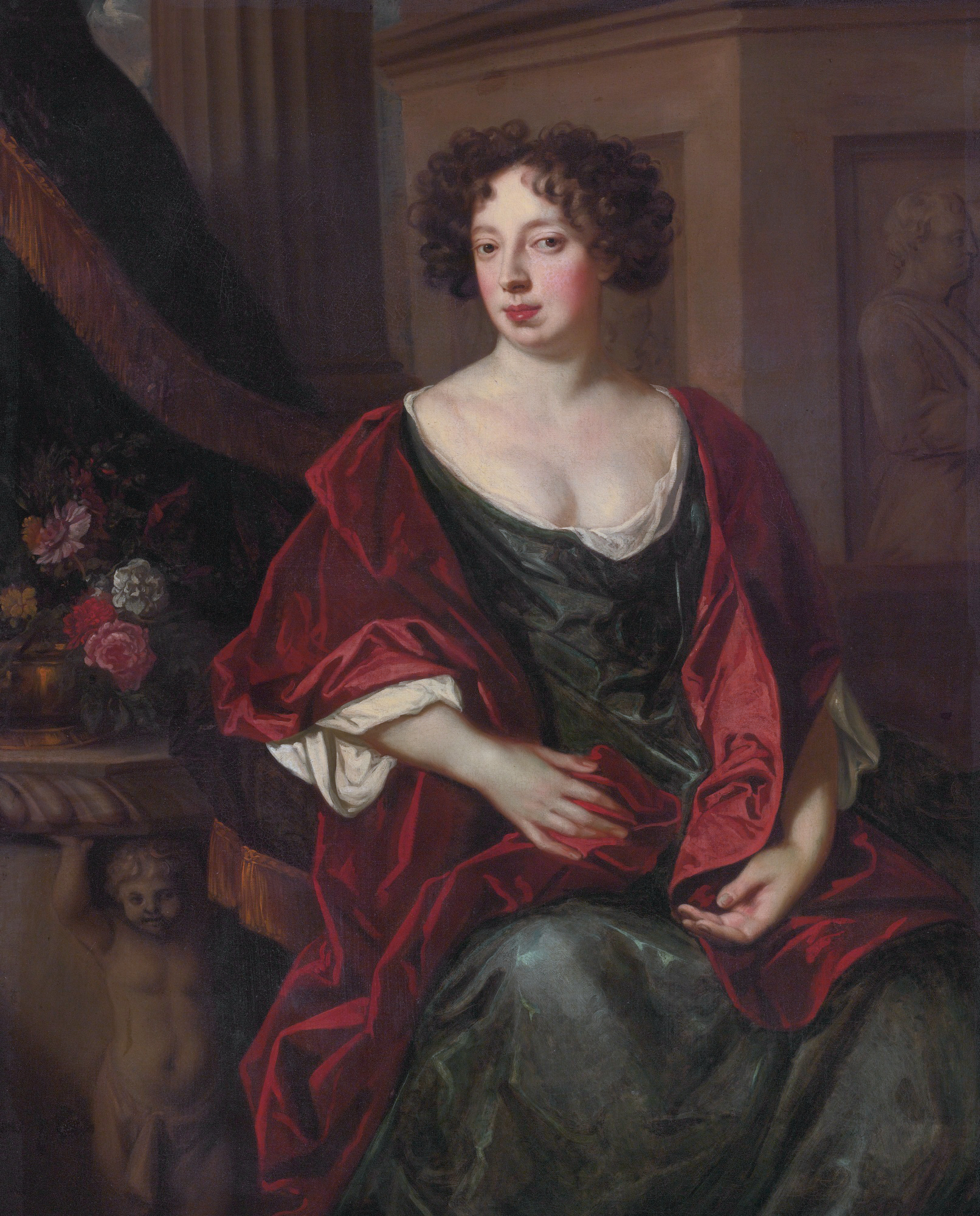
- Lady Nottingham, née Lady Essex Rich (studio of Peter Lely)
- Born: Essex Rich c. 1652; England
- Died: 23 March 1684 (aged 31–32); London, England
- Cause of death: Childbirth
- Buried: Ravenstone, Buckinghamshire, England
- Spouse: Daniel Finch (m. 1674)
- Issue: Mary Finch
- Parents: Robert Rich, 3rd Earl of Warwick; Anne Cheeke

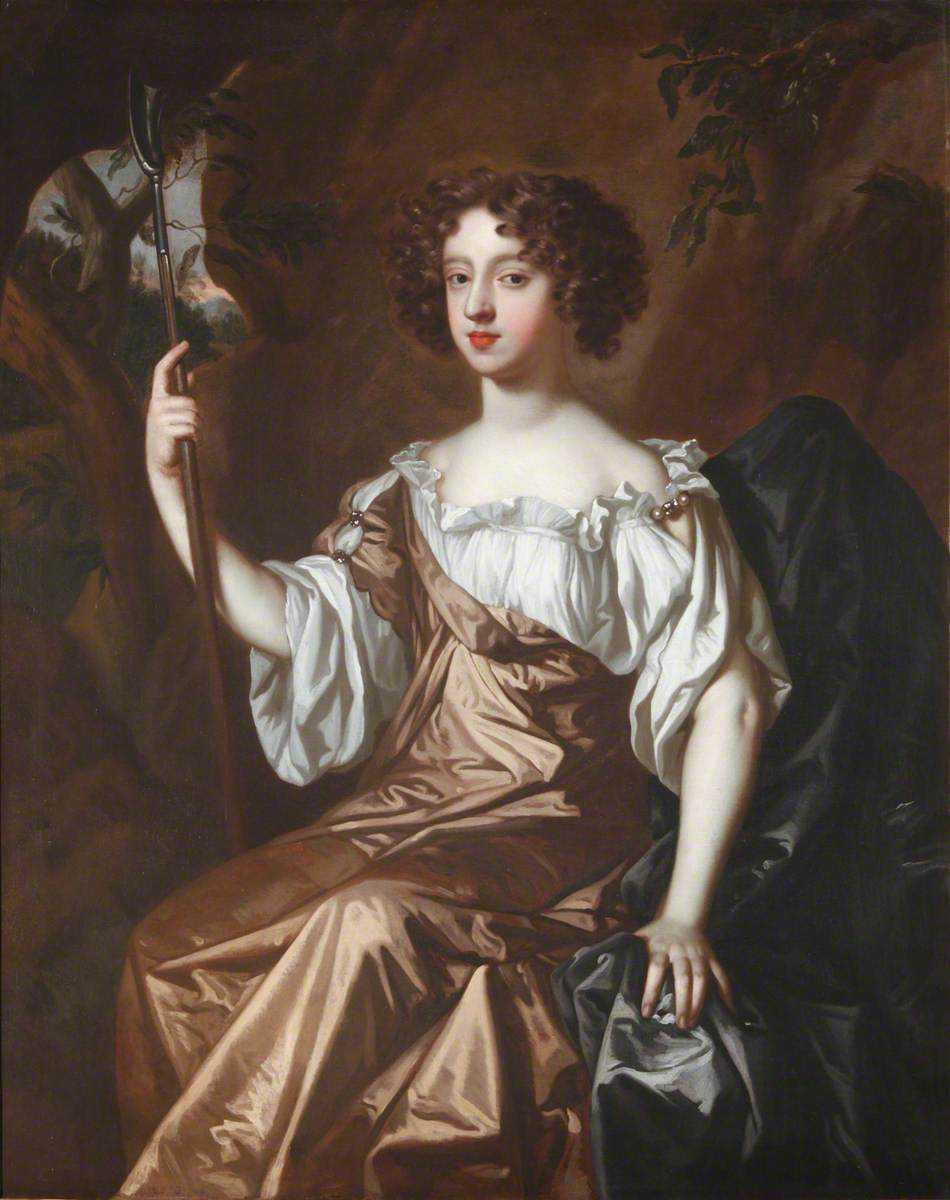
:Peter Lely (1618-1680) - Lady Essex Rich

Essex Finch, Countess of Nottingham (née Rich; c.1652 – 23 March 1684) was the first wife of Daniel Finch, 2nd Earl of Nottingham.

Essex was the youngest daughter of Robert Rich, 3rd Earl of Warwick, and his second wife Anne Cheeke. She was named after her mother's mother, who was also descended from Robert Rich, 1st Earl of Warwick. Following her mother's death, Essex and her sisters were brought up in the household of her father's brother, Charles Rich, 4th Earl of Warwick.

Her paternal grandparents were Robert Rich, 2nd Earl of Warwick and Frances Hatton (great niece of Sir Christopher Hatton).

The suitors considered for Lady Essex Rich included the son of Baron Berkeley of Stratton and Thomas Vane. However, on 16 June 1674, she married Daniel Finch at Leez Priory, near Felsted, and they moved in with his parents at Kensington Palace. The couple had eight children but only one daughter survived to adulthood:

- Mary Finch (1677–1718), who married William Savile, 2nd Marquess of Halifax, as his second wife, following the death of his first wife Elizabeth Grimston. Halifax died in 1700 and she then married John Ker, 1st Duke of Roxburghe.

The Countess of Nottingham died in childbirth, and was buried in the family vault at Ravenstone. Following her death, her husband remarried to her distant cousin the Hon. Anne Hatton, by whom he had many children.
