= John Robinson (painter) =

English portrait painter (1715–1745)

John Robinson (1715–1745) was an English portrait-painter and drawer (artists).

== Life ==
John Robinson was born at Bath in 1715. He studied under John Vanderbank, and attained some success as a portrait-painter. Having married a wife with a fortune, he, on the death of Charles Jervas, purchased that painter's house in Cleveland Court. He thus inherited a fashionable practice; but he had not skill enough to keep it up. He dressed many of his sitters in the costume of portraits by Vandyck.

Robinson died in 1745, before completing his thirtieth year. A portrait of Lady Charlotte Finch by Robinson was engraved in mezzotint by John Faber the Younger, and the title of the print subsequently altered to The Amorous Beauty.
