= Holy Cross Church, Burley =

Coordinates: 52.6824°N 0.6952°W

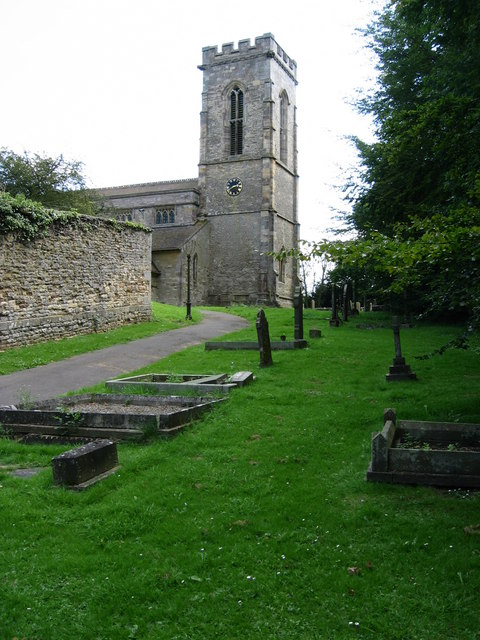
- The tower and part of the nave of Holy Cross Church, Burley, from the north

- Location in Rutland
- OS grid reference: SK 883,102
- Location: Burley, Rutland
- Country: England
- Denomination: Anglican
- Website: Churches Conservation Trust

Architecture
- Functional status: Redundant
- Heritage designation: Grade II*
- Designated: 14 June 1954
- Architectural type: Church
- Style: Norman, Gothic
- Groundbreaking: 12th century
- Completed: 1870

Specifications
- Materials: Stone, red tile roofs

Holy Cross Church is a redundant Anglican church in the village of Burley, Rutland, England. It is recorded in the National Heritage List for England as a designated Grade II* listed building, and is under the care of the Churches Conservation Trust. It stands adjacent to Burley House.

== History ==
Building of the church started in the 12th century. By the end of that century it consisted of a nave, chancel and north aisle. During the following century the south aisle was added. In the 14th century the tower was built. The church was restored in about 1796 when square-headed windows were inserted, and box pews were added. In 1869–70 the church was extensively restored by J. L. Pearson. This included rebuilding the east end, replacing all but one of the windows, and adding a new porch. The church was declared redundant on 1 May 1984, and was vested in the Churches Conservation Trust on 17 February 1988.

== Architecture ==
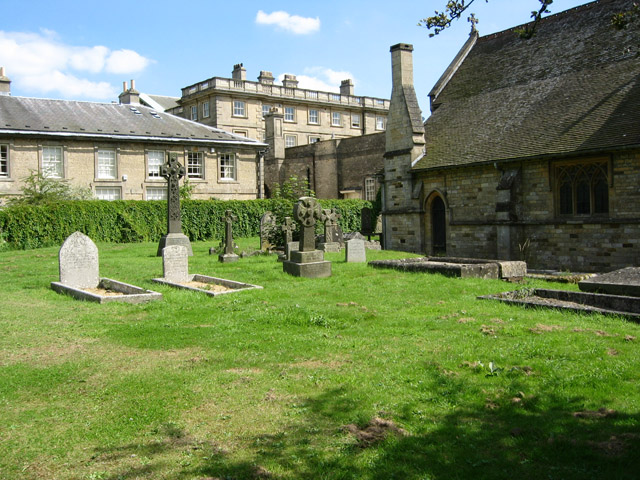
Looking from the churchyard across to the mansion

=== Exterior ===
Holy Cross is constructed in stone of differing colours, and has red tile roofs. Its plan consists of a four-bay nave with a clerestory, north and south aisles, a three-bay chancel, a north porch, and a west tower. The nave measures 44 feet 9 inches (13.6 m) by 17 feet (5.2 m), the chancel 39 feet (11.9 m) by 13 feet 6 inches (4.1 m), the north aisle 10 feet 6 inches (3.2 m) by 8 feet (2.4 m), and the south aisle 11 feet 3 inches (3.4 m) by 7 feet (2.1 m). The tower is in three stages separated by string courses. It is set on a moulded plinth, and has paired buttresses at the corners. On the west side of the bottom stage is a two-light window with Decorated tracery, and on the north side in the middle stage is a clock face. On each side of the top stage is a tall two-light transomed bell opening. At the top of the tower is a battlemented parapet, under which is a moulding carved with flowers and animals' heads. There is a gargoyle at each corner. The east window has five lights and geometrical tracery. All the windows along the clerestory and the aisles are flat-headed. On the north wall of the church is a chimney and a priest's doorway.

=== Interior ===
The two arcades are of different age and style. The north arcade dates from the 12th century and is Norman in style with round arches, while the south arcade is Gothic, dating from the 13th century with pointed arches. Between the nave and the chancel is a low screen in pierced stone. The octagonal font is Perpendicular in style. The stained glass in the east window dates from about 1870 and is by Clayton and Bell, while that in the west window is by Westlake. In the church is an alabaster monument with mutilated effigies dating from the late 15th century. There is also a memorial by Chantrey to Lady Charlotte Finch who died in 1813, and who had been governess to the children of George III. In the tower is a single bell, cast in 1705 by Alexander Rigby of Stamford. There is a memorial to George Finch within the church and his grave lies north of the chancel. He was a Conservative politician, who represented Rutland in the House of Commons for forty years, becoming Father of the House of Commons.

There is also a notable turret clock with an anchor escapement; it was made by Joseph Knibb in 1678.

== See also ==
- List of churches preserved by the Churches Conservation Trust in the English Midlands
- List of ecclesiastical restorations and alterations by J. L. Pearson
