= William Finch (diplomat) =

British diplomat and Whig politician

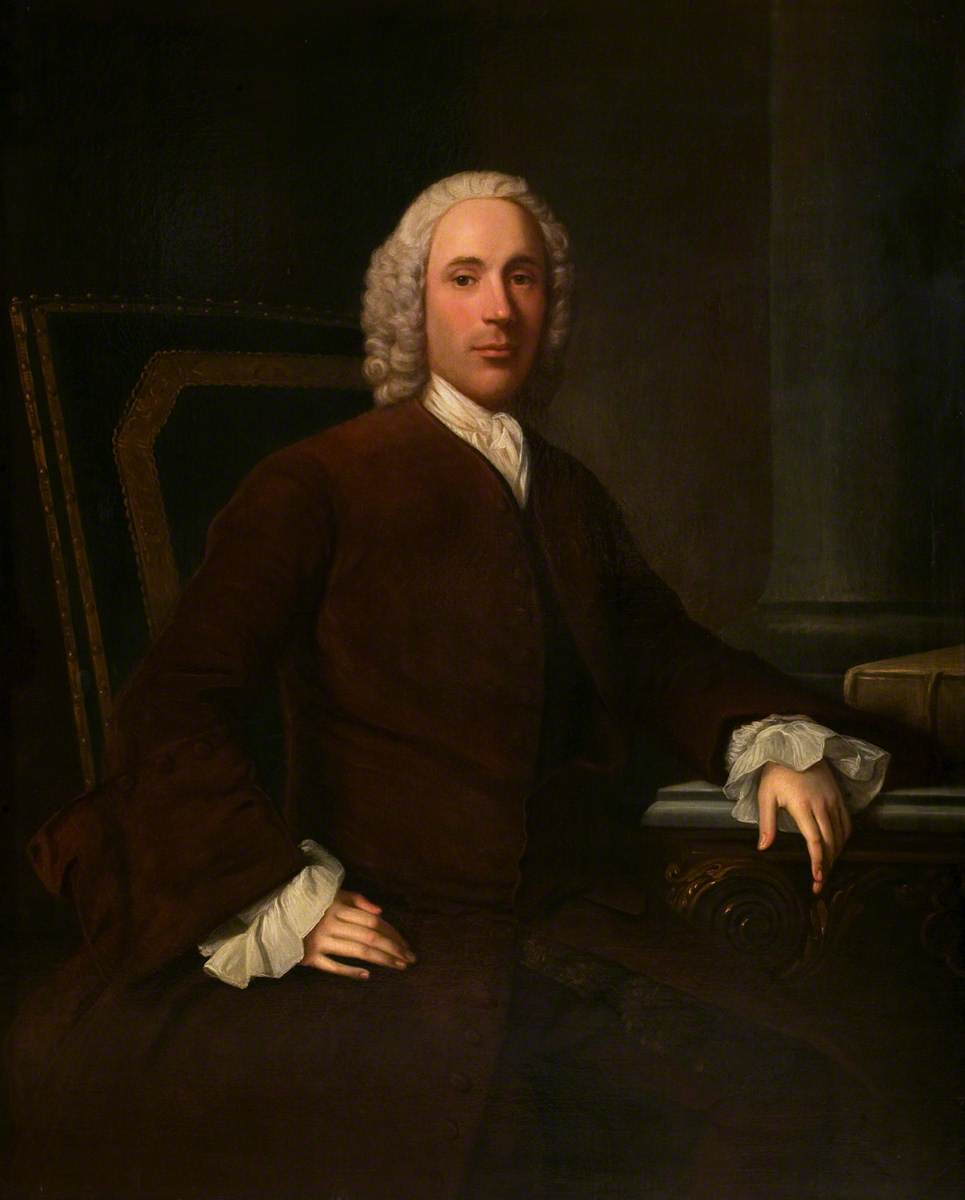
- Finch by Allan Ramsay, 1744

Member of the British House of Commons
- In office 1755–1761
- Preceded by: William Lyttelton
- Succeeded by: Edward Winnington
- Constituency: Bewdley
- In office 1727–1754
- Preceded by: Thomas Pengelly
- Succeeded by: Percy Wyndham-O'Brien
- Constituency: Cockermouth

Personal details
- Born: 18 January 1691
- Died: 25 December 1766 (aged 75)
- Party: Whig
- Spouse(s): Anne Douglas (m. 1733; died 1741) Charlotte Fermor (m. 1746)
- Children: Charlotte, Sophia, Frances, Henrietta, and George
- Parent(s): Daniel Finch; Anne Hatton

William Finch PC (18 January 1691 – 25 December 1766) of Charlewood, Hertfordshire, was a British diplomat and Whig politician who sat in the House of Commons from 1727 to 1761. He was considered an indolent diplomat and became an opponent of Walpole, but maintained his post in the Royal Household for over 20 years until he began to lose his senses.

== Early life ==
Finch was the second son of Daniel Finch and his second wife Anne Hatton. He matriculated at Christ Church, Oxford on 4 March, 1707, aged 16, and became a student of Inner Temple in 1710.

== Career ==
Arms of Finch: Argent, a chevron between three griffins passant sable

When John Carteret went to Sweden as ambassador from 1719 to 1720, Finch accompanied him as his secretary. Carteret returned to Britain and secured Finch's appointment as envoy there in his place until 1724. Finch was then appointed envoy to United Provinces until 1728.

At the 1727 British general election, Finch was elected as a member of the House of Commons for Cockermouth on the interest of his brother-in-law the Duke of Somerset. He voted with the government, but was sent on another mission as minister to The Netherlands from 1733 to 1734. He had been admonished by Carteret previously for lack of diligence, and it was considered that his indolent ministry had put the Netherlands into the hands of France. Walpole sent his brother Horace to The Hague as ambassador on a special mission, and Finch took umbrage and asked to be recalled. He was returned unopposed at the 1734 British general election and went into opposition against Walpole. He was returned for Cockermouth again at the 1741 British general election.

After the fall of Walpole in 1742, he and his brother Edward Finch obtained posts in the Royal Household by their connection to Lord Carteret. He was appointed Vice-Chamberlain of the Household and a Member of the Privy Council. He survived in post after Carteret was dismissed in 1744 and again after Carteret tried unsuccessfully to form an administration in 1746, when there was a bid to purge public offices of his adherents. He remained in post until 1765. He was returned as MP for Cockermouth at the 1747 British general election, but at the 1754 British general election he was encouraged to take a seat elsewhere and was not returned.

Finch was returned as MP for Bewdley on the Lyttelton interest at a by-election on 5 February 1755. He did not run again. He began to lose his sanity and in 1765 he was pensioned off from his post at the Royal Household.

== Marriage and family ==
Finch married Anne Douglas, daughter of James Douglas on 25 January 1733. She died without children on 26 October 1741.

He married as his second wife Charlotte Fermor, daughter of Thomas Fermor on 9 August 1746. Horace Walpole described him as Attractive "comely black widower". They had a son and four daughters:

- Charlotte Finch (born 1 September 1747)
- Sophia Finch (born 17 October 1748): Married Captain Charles Fielding in 1772 and had issue.
- Frances Finch (23 September 1749 –1765)
- Henrietta Finch (born 28 December 1750)
- George Finch (4 November 1752 – 2 August 1826)

Finch's wife was a governess to the royal children. In his madness, Finch had beaten her and thrown her down stairs, and as a result they were separated by articles. However they still remained on civil terms. Finch died on 25 December 1766.

== Ancestry ==
Ancestors of William Finch (diplomat)

Heneage Finch
Heneage Finch
Frances Bell
Daniel Finch
Daniel Harvey
Elizabeth Harvey
William Finch
Christopher Hatton
Christopher Hatton
Elizabeth Montagu
Anne Hatton

Diplomatic posts
Preceded by John Carteret, 2nd Baron Carteret	Envoy-Extraordinary to Sweden; 1720–1724	Succeeded by Stephen Poyntz
Preceded by James Dayrolle as Resident	Envoy-Extraordinary to the Netherlands; 1724–1728	Succeeded by Earl of Chesterfield
Preceded by Earl of Chesterfield	Envoy-Extraordinary to the Netherlands; 1733–1734	Succeeded by Horatio Walpole
Parliament of Great Britain
Preceded by Sir Thomas Pengelly; Sir Wilfrid Lawson	Member of Parliament for Cockermouth; 1727–1747; With: Sir Wilfrid Lawson 1727–1738; Eldred Curwen 1738–1741; Sir John Mordaunt 1741–1747	Succeeded by Sir John Mordaunt; Sir Charles Wyndham
Preceded by Sir John Mordaunt; Sir Charles Wyndham	Member of Parliament for Cockermouth; 1747–1754; With: Sir John Mordaunt	Succeeded by Sir John Mordaunt; Percy Wyndham-O'Brien
Preceded by William Henry Lyttelton	Bewdley; 1755–1761	Succeeded by Sir Edward Winnington, 1st Baronet
Government offices
Preceded by Lord Sidney Beauclerk	Vice-Chamberlain of the Household; 1742–1765	Succeeded by Viscount Villiers
