= Thomas Fermor, 1st Earl of Pomfret =

English peer and courtier (1698–1753)

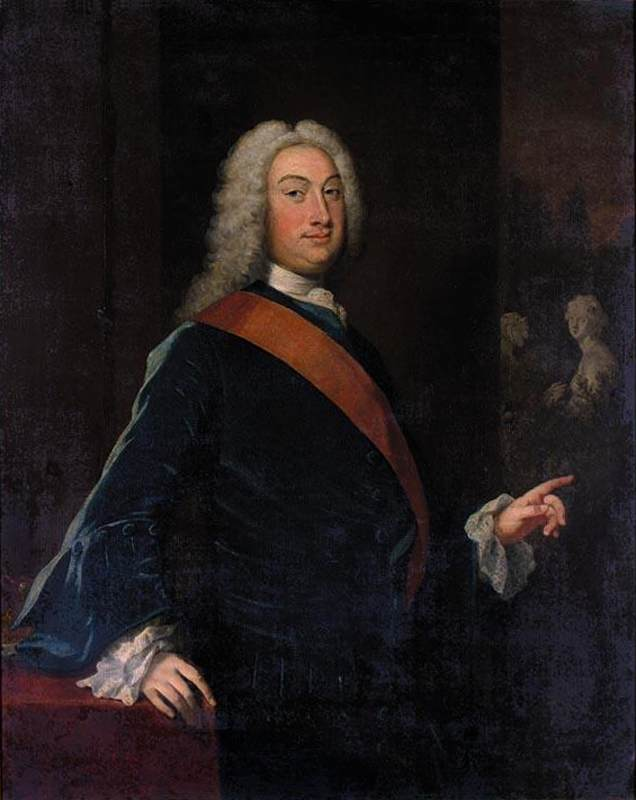
- portrait by Joseph Highmore
- Born: 23 March 1698
- Died: 15 July 1753 (aged 55)
- Spouse(s): Henrietta Louisa Fermor
- Children: George Fermor, 2nd Earl of Pomfret, Lady Charlotte Finch, Lady Juliana Fermor Penn, Lady Sophia Fermor, Lady Henrietta Fermor, Lady Louisa Fermor, Lady Anne Fermor
- Parent(s): William Fermor, 1st Baron Leominster; Lady Sophia Osborne
- Titles: Earl of Pomfret (1st, 1721–)

Thomas Fermor, 1st Earl of Pomfret (1698 – 8 July 1753) was an English peer and courtier. He was the only son of William Fermor, 1st Baron Leominster by his third wife Lady Sophia Osborne. He succeeded to his father's barony on his death in 1711 as 2nd Baron Leominster. The Earldom of Pomfret was created for him on 27 December 1721, named after Pontefract in Yorkshire. He was made a Knight Companion of the Order of the Bath in 1725.

In September 1727 he was appointed master of the horse to Caroline, queen consort to the newly acceded George II—Fermor's wife was also made one of the ladies of Caroline's bedchamber. Caroline died in November 1737 and in September 1738 Thomas and his wife took a three-year tour in France and Italy, visiting Florence, Bologna, Venice, Augsburg, Frankfurt and Brussels.

== Marriage and issue ==
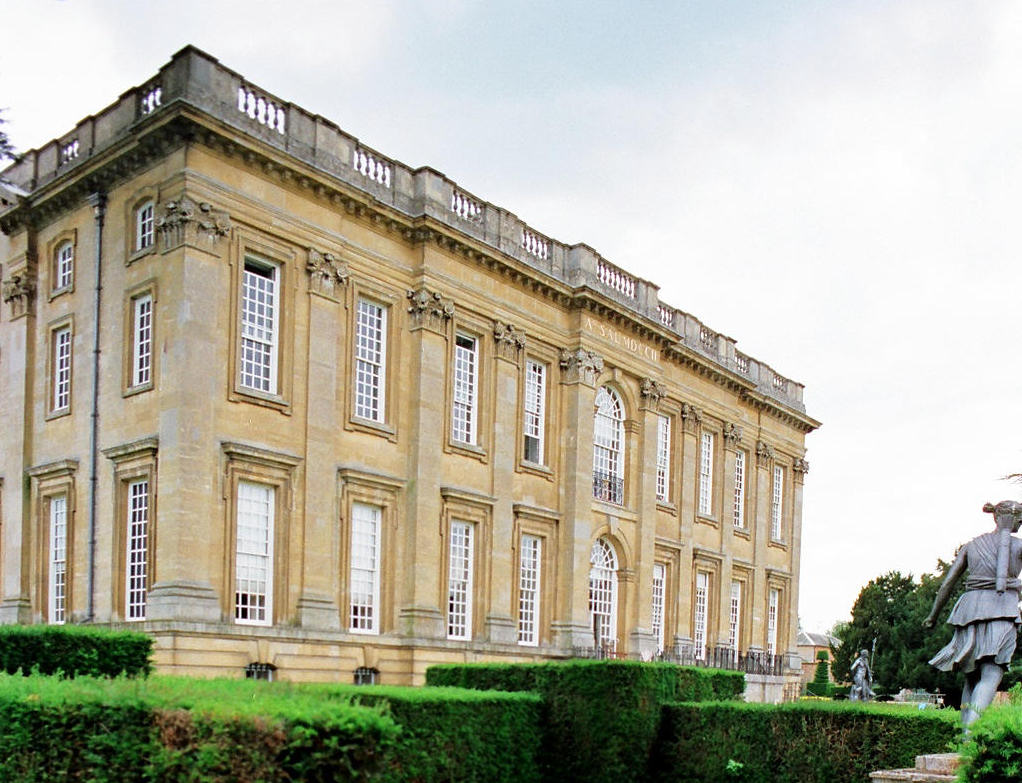
Easton Neston House (seat of Earls of Pomfret)

On 14 July 1720 he married Henrietta Louisa Jeffreys, the only surviving child of John Jeffreys, 2nd Baron Jeffreys of Wem and granddaughter of George Jeffreys, 1st Baron Jeffreys. They had four sons and six daughters, including:

- George Fermor, 2nd Earl of Pomfret (1722–1785), who succeeded his father
- Lady Charlotte Fermor (1725–1813), wife of Hon. William Finch, later governess to the children of George III
- Lady Sophia Frances Fermor (died 1745), wife of John Carteret, 2nd Earl Granville
- Lady Juliana Fermor (1729-1801), later wife of Thomas Penn
- Lady Anne Fermor (1733-1769), wife of Thomas Dawson, 1st Viscount Cremorne

Peerage of Great Britain
| New creation | Earl of Pomfret; 1721–1753 | Succeeded by George Fermor |
Peerage of England
| Preceded by William Fermor | Baron Leominster; 1711–1753 | Succeeded by George Fermor |
Political offices
| Preceded by Duke of St Albans | Master of the Horse to Queen Caroline; 1727-1737 | Vacant (death of Caroline) |
