= Lady Charlotte Finch =

British noble

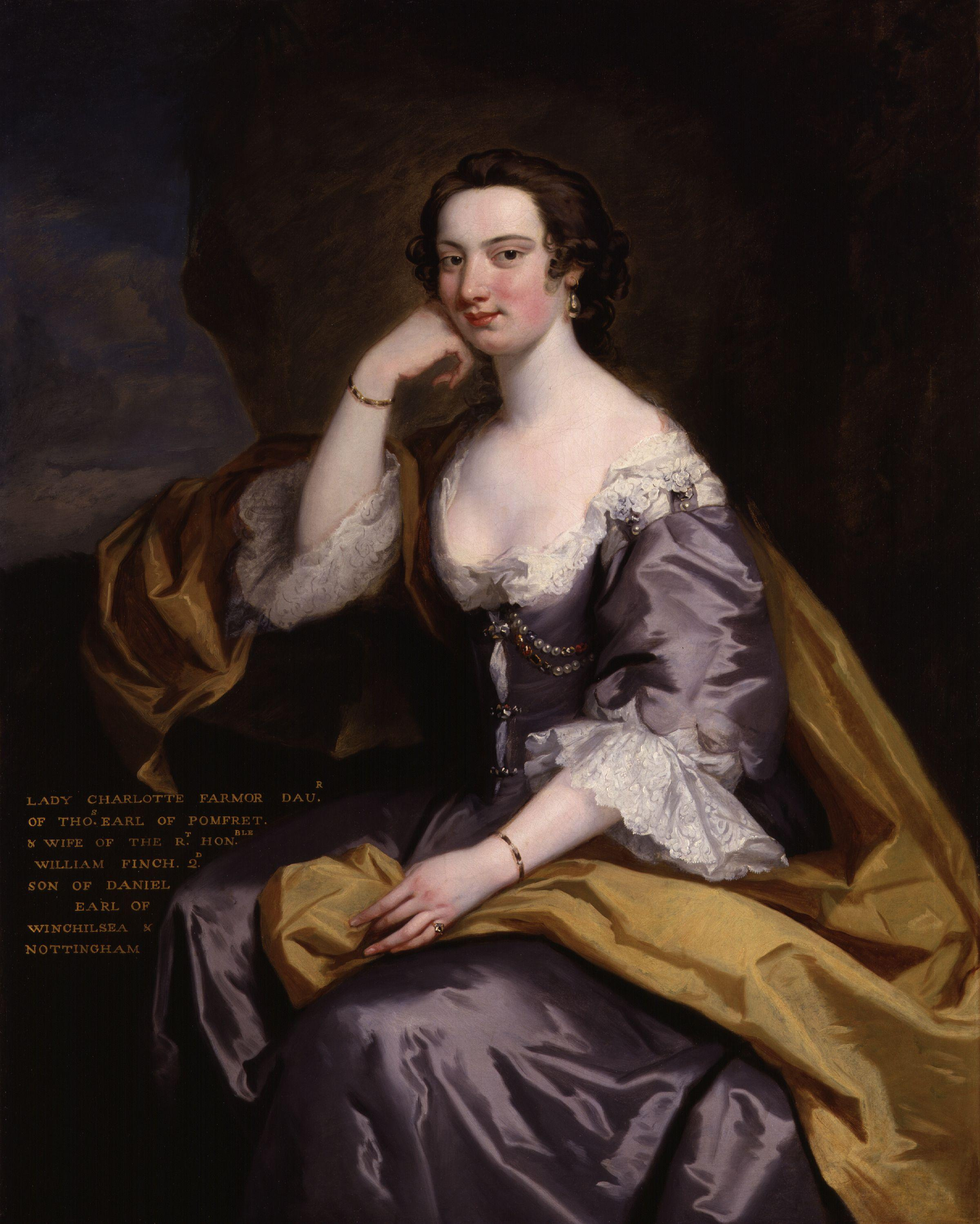
- Lady Charlotte Finch, painting after John Robinson c.1745
- Born: Lady Charlotte Fermor; 14 February 1725
- Died: 11 July 1813 (aged 88); St James's Palace
- Buried: Ravenstone, Buckinghamshire
- Spouse: William Finch (m. 1746)
- Issue: George Finch, 9th Earl of Winchilsea; Sophia Fielding
- Father: Thomas Fermor, 1st Earl of Pomfret
- Mother: Henrietta Louisa Jeffreys
- Occupation: Royal governess

Lady Charlotte Finch (née Fermor; 14 February 1725 – 11 July 1813) was the British royal governess to the children of King George III and Queen Charlotte for over thirty years, holding the position from 1762 to 1793. Her parents were courtiers Thomas Fermor, 1st Earl of Pomfret, and Henrietta Louisa Jeffreys. The couple were educated and frequently travelled with their growing brood of children to the continent. Charlotte, like her sisters, was well educated; in 1746, she married the Hon. William Finch and had issue including George Finch, 9th Earl of Winchilsea.

An accomplished woman, Finch gained her appointment as royal governess in August 1762 upon the birth of George, Prince of Wales, the eldest son of King George and Queen Charlotte. Finch's duties included oversight of the royal nursery and all the staff employed therein, as well as organising lessons for the children. Finch oversaw the princes' education until they became old enough to live in their own households under the watch of governors, while the six princesses remained under her supervision until they turned 21. Finch retired from her role in 1793, though she continued to correspond with members of the royal family and receive gifts from them.

== Early life and marriage ==
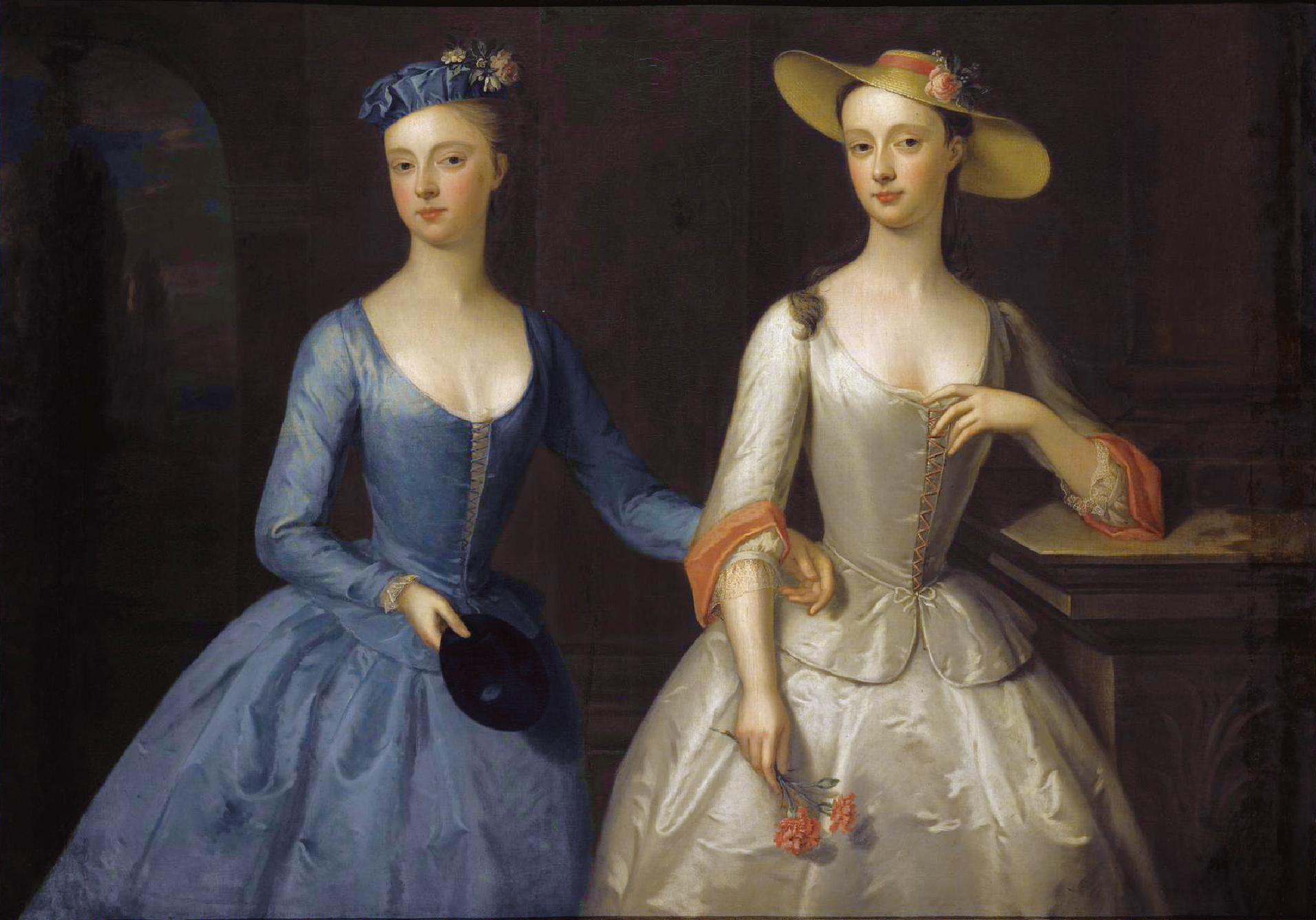
Lady Charlotte (right) and her sister Sophia (left, later Lady Granville), c. 1741

Lady Charlotte Fermor was born on 14 February 1725, the second eldest daughter of Thomas Fermor, 1st Earl of Pomfret and his wife Henrietta Louisa Jeffreys. The growing family would come to include ten children: four sons and six daughters. Lord and Lady Pomfret held various court appointments during their lifetimes; the earl served as Master of the Horse to Queen Caroline while his wife was a Lady of the Bedchamber.

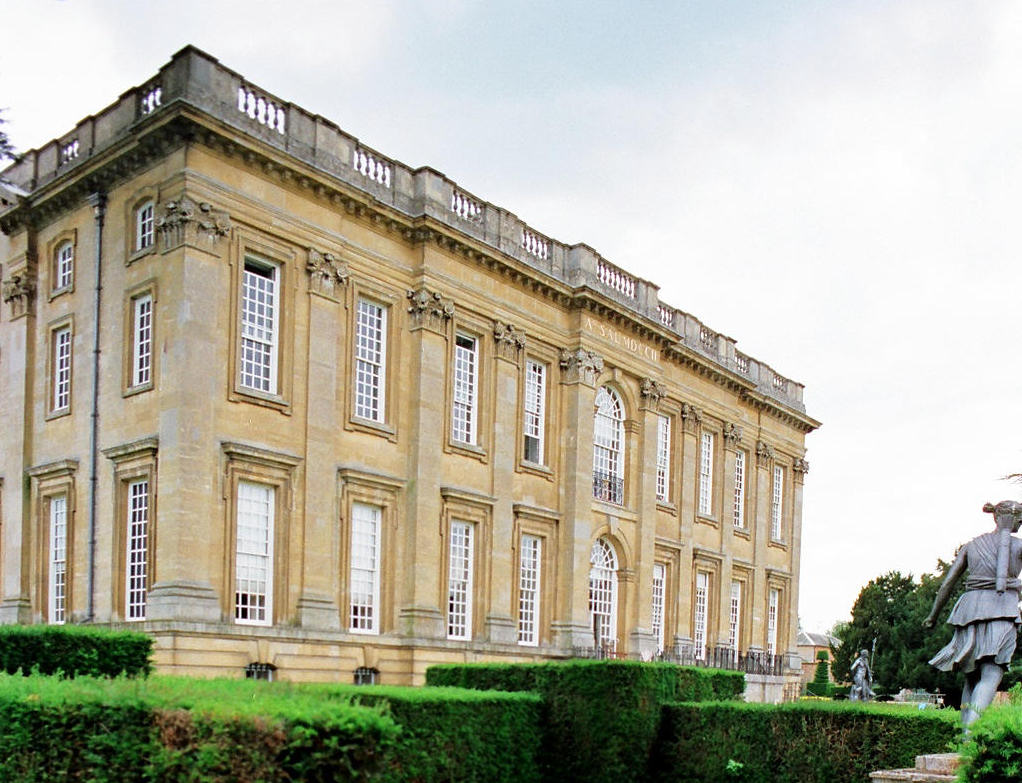
Easton Neston House (Charlotte Fermor's family home)

Charlotte and her family were well travelled and sojourned to cultural and historical landmarks on the continent. While details on Fermor and her sisters' education are minimal, mention of them in contemporary diaries implies they were well educated. She and Lady Pomfret were well read and interested in theology; Charlotte's friends included the educated Elizabeth Carter. Charlotte was fluent enough in Italian for Horace Walpole to remark in 1740, she "speaks the purest Tuscan, like any Florentine" and "the Florentines look on her as the brightest foreigner that has honoured their [Accademia]." According to Walpole, Lord Granville, who had been briefly married to Charlotte's sister Sophia, was "extremely fond" of Charlotte; after Sophia's death in 1745, Granville gave his deceased wife's jewels to Charlotte, "to the great discontent of his own daughters".

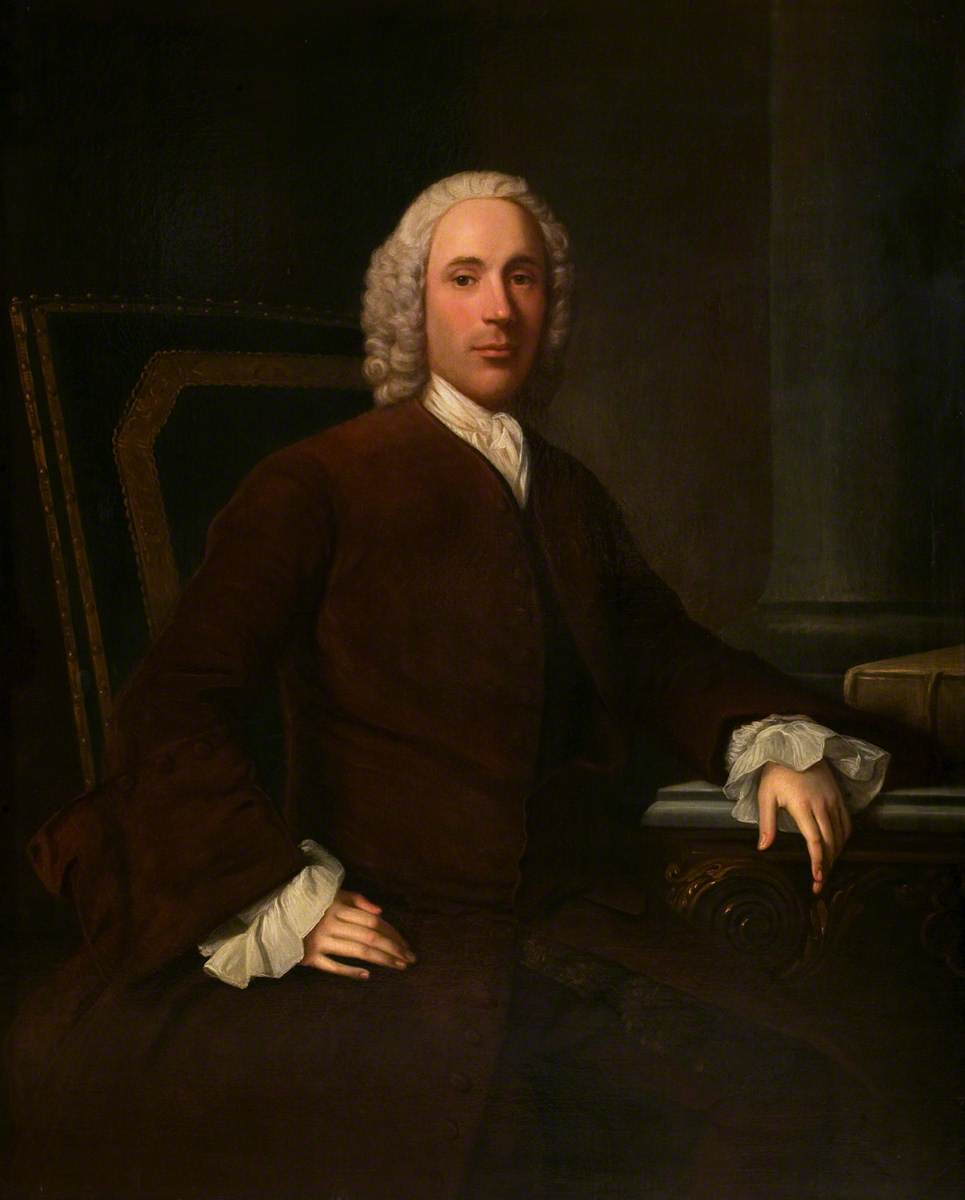
Hon. William Finch c. 1744

=== Marriage ===
On 9 August 1746, Charlotte married the Hon. William Finch (1691–1766), heir to his brother Daniel Finch, 8th Earl of Winchilsea. Shortly after the wedding, Walpole called William Finch as an attractive "comely black widower" and reported that Charlotte had five thousand pounds from her father, a sum that would increase when "Mr Finch settles fifteen thousand pounds more upon her". Walpole also said that Lord Granville who was always fond of Charlotte, gave her all her late sister Lady Granville's jewels to the dismay of his own daughter.

William Finch had previously been married to Lady Anne Douglas, daughter of Duke of Queensberry but she died with no issue. He was a diplomat who served as envoy to Sweden and the Netherlands in the 1720s before becoming an MP for Cockermouth and Bewdley. Another of his roles, held from 1742, was to serve as vice-chamberlain of the royal household. He and Lady Charlotte had one son and four daughters together. One of their daughters died in 1765. Their only son, George, inherited the earldoms of Nottingham and Winchilsea from his paternal uncle in 1769.

== Royal governess ==
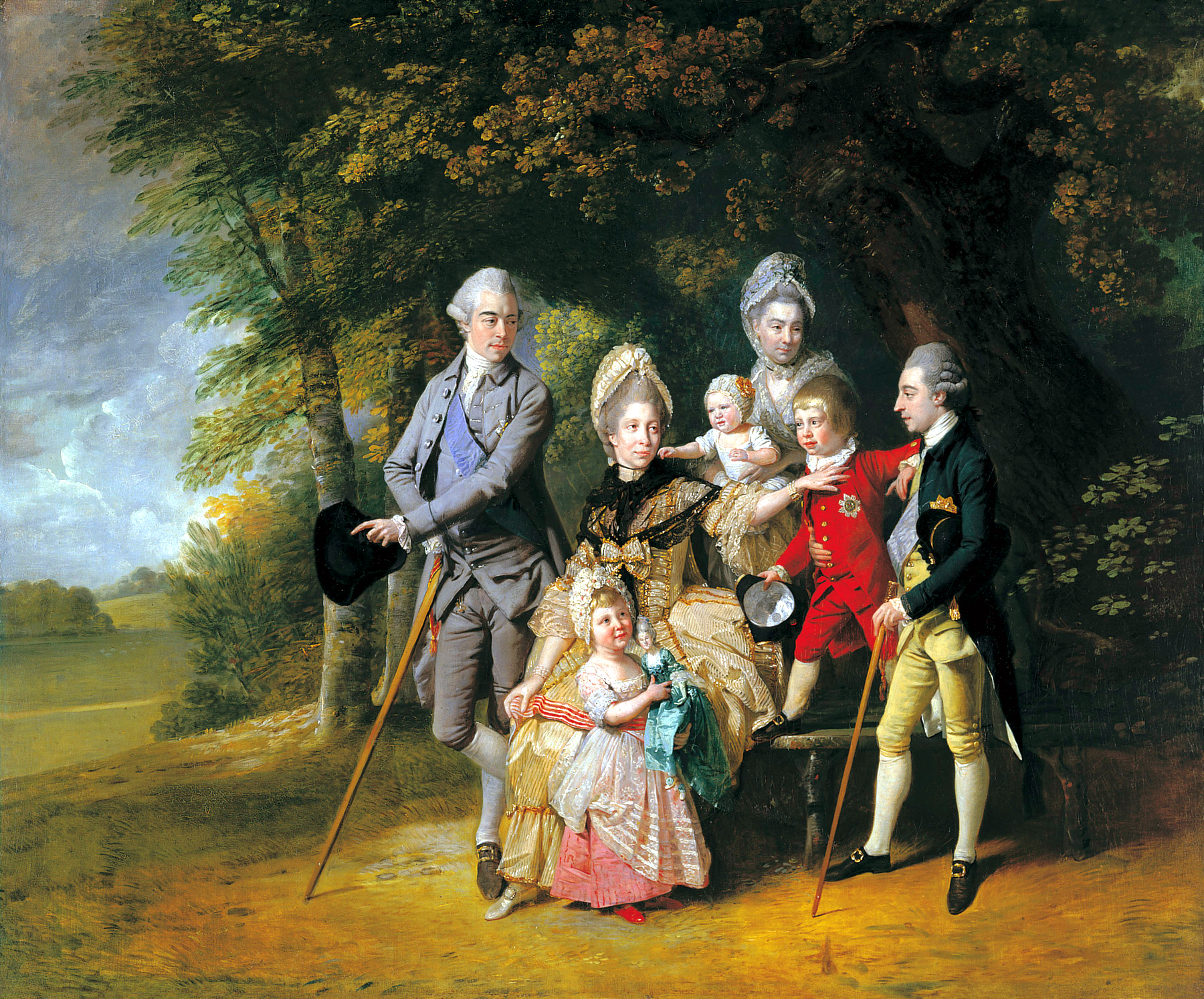
Queen Charlotte with Members of Her Family (c. 1771–72) by Johann Zoffany. Lady Charlotte Finch is standing at the back, holding the baby.

Lady Charlotte Finch's career as royal governess began in August 1762, when she was appointed a day after the birth of George, Prince of Wales, the eldest son and heir of King George III and Queen Charlotte. Walpole called the decision "a choice so universally approved that I do not think she will be abused even in the North Briton". Finch's biographer, Jill Shefrin, writes that the governess was noted for the skill she devoted to the raising of her own children, while Christopher Hibbert suggests that her educated background made her "well suited" to the position. Lady Charlotte held the role of royal governess for over 30 years, and oversaw 14 of the king and queen's 15 children. (Note: Princess Amelia – whom Lady Charlotte left without a governess by her November 1792 resignation – was thereafter raised by other staff.) She presided over the royal nursery, overseeing the staff members designated for each child; the staff included sub-governesses, teachers, personal attendants, and assistant governesses. She oversaw the princes until they became old enough to live in their own households, while the six princesses remained under her supervision until they turned 21.

In the mid-1760s, shortly after her appointment, troubling developments began occurring in Lady Charlotte's home. One of her daughters died in 1765. Furthermore, William Finch, who was 34 years older than his wife, had by 1765 become senile and mentally unstable. Rumours circulated that he threw her down a staircase. Fearing for her safety, she obtained a formal separation from her husband, taking their children to live with her in an apartment at St James's Palace and a house in Kew. He died in late 1766. Despite these stresses on her personal life, Finch continued to fulfil her position with zeal. However, when another of her daughters became ill in early 1767, Finch took leave of her job and brought the young girl to various locales in the unsuccessful hope she would survive. Finch left the sub-governess Mrs Cotesworth in charge and returned grieving in November 1767, in time to care for the fifth addition to the nursery, Prince Edward.

=== Educational approach and lessons ===
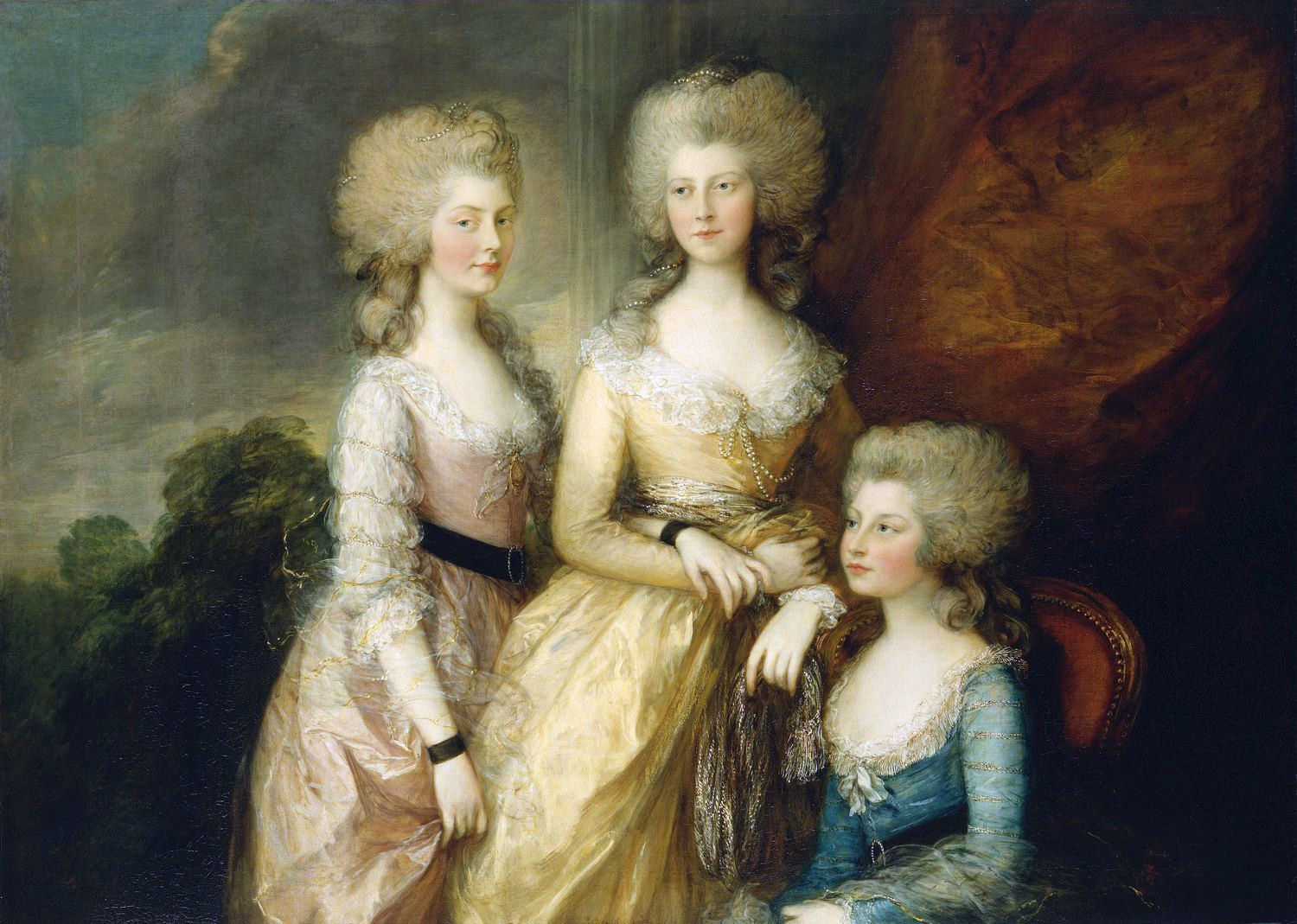
The three eldest daughters of George III, 1784

Lady Charlotte has been variously described by biographers as warm, competent, and kindly. As was typical for the period, the children were infrequently seen by the king and queen; Finch was the unvarying adult figure in their lives. While the royal princes endured disciplined lessons in an austere educational environment, Finch was loved by her female charges. They affectionately referred to her as "Lady Cha", and upon returning from a trip to the continent in 1771, Queen Charlotte wrote her, "They can never be in better hands than yours". Shefrin says that Finch "supervised a progressive nursery focused on child-centred learning" and shared a passion for education with Queen Charlotte, as is evident in their correspondence and the writings of contemporaries; the idea of noble mothers encouraging education for their children—a concept advocated by educators and scholars—was becoming popular, and Finch's approach at court helped spread these new educational theories. Among the methods she employed was the use of "dissected maps", some of the earliest jigsaw puzzles, to teach geography.

The historian Flora Fraser writes that "in many ways, the education... ordered for the princesses would be as rigorous as" that which the king ordered for the princes. Queen Charlotte felt that a woman equipped with an education was as able as a man. An accomplished woman herself, Finch, alongside Mrs Cotesworth, organised lessons in the arts and sciences which were taught to both the princes and princesses. Subjects included geography, English, grammar, music, needlework, dancing, and art. A tutor, Julie Krohme, taught the children in the French language. Once old enough, the princesses would travel each day to receive their education at Finch's new house at Kew alongside the river. Conversely, the princes gradually saw less of Lady Charlotte as they became older and entered into the care of governors.

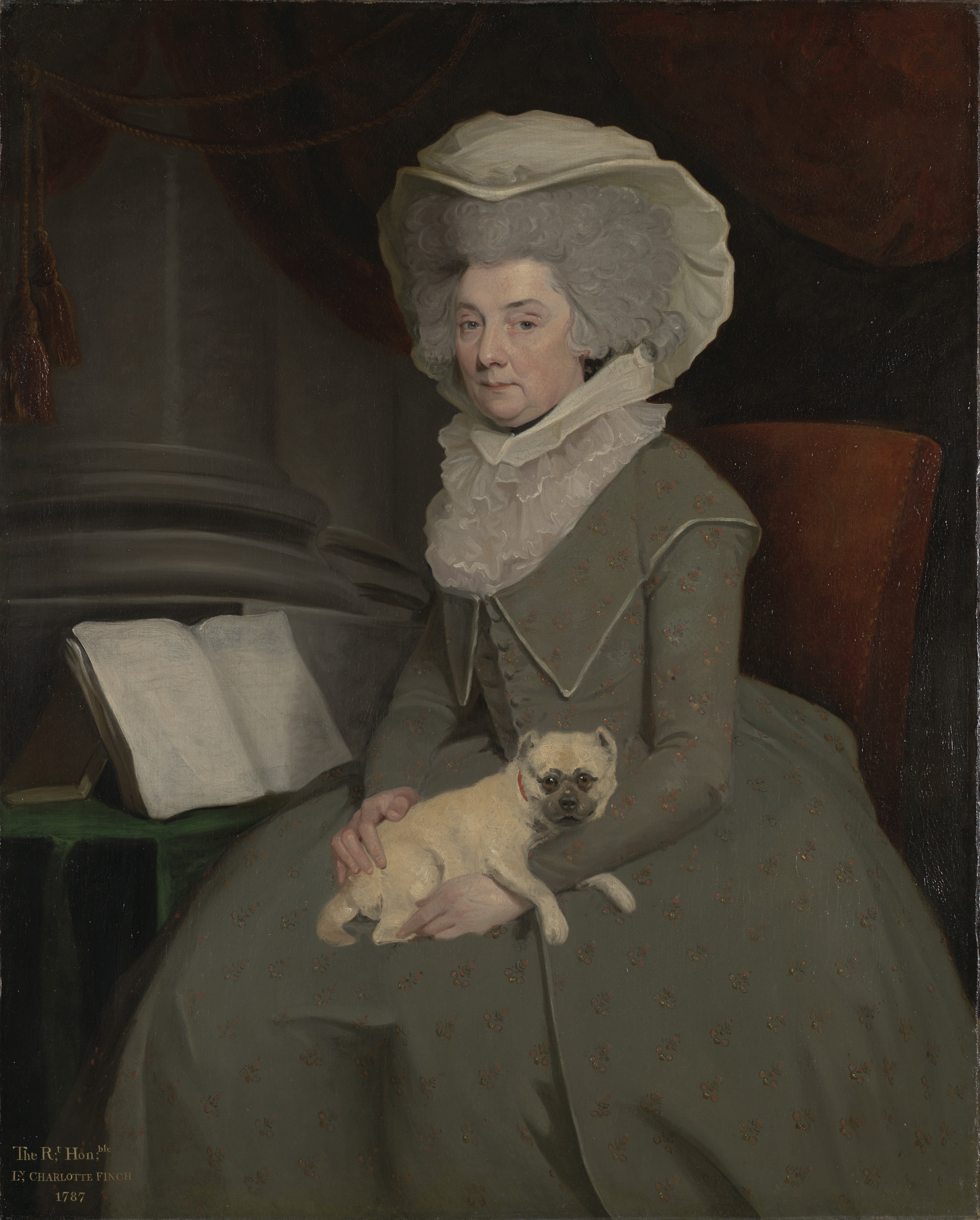
Lady Charlotte Finch by William Hopkins, 1787

In 1774, Mrs Cotesworth retired due to ill health. While seeking a successor, Lady Charlotte requested that she devote less time to the children. This was opposed by Queen Charlotte. The monarch felt that Cotesworth's resignation was partly due to Finch decreasing hours with the children, and also thought the other staff would be encouraged by Finch increasing her presence and "make them look upon it as a less confinement". Finch replied that she had regularly spent many hours with the princesses, both mornings and evenings, adding:

How can I without deviating from my own principles undertake an additional duty of a kind for which I am conscious I am growing every day more unfit, as your Majesty must know what an uncommon stock of spirits and cheerfulness is necessary to go through the growing attendance of so many and such very young people in their amusements, as well as behaviour and instruction, besides ordering all the affairs of the nursery.

Lady Charlotte threatened to resign so that the queen could hire someone "younger and more fitted for it", a declaration which ended Queen Charlotte's quest to increase her hours. Finch remained at her post. A new sub-governess, Martha Gouldsworthy (sister to Lieutenant-General Philip Goldsworthy, a favoured equerry of the king)—hired on Finch's recommendation—now spent frequent time with the princesses, chaperoning and supervising their studies in preparation for their lessons with their teacher Miss Planta. In April 1777, Another Lady was appointed by Queen Charlotte to be the third sub-governess, Mary Hamilton (niece of diplomat Sir William Hamilton), she would describe her experiences in her diaries and letters. In 1782, the 14th royal child, Prince Alfred, sickened and died at Windsor near the age of two, despite Lady Charlotte's devoted nursing.

=== Retirement and death ===
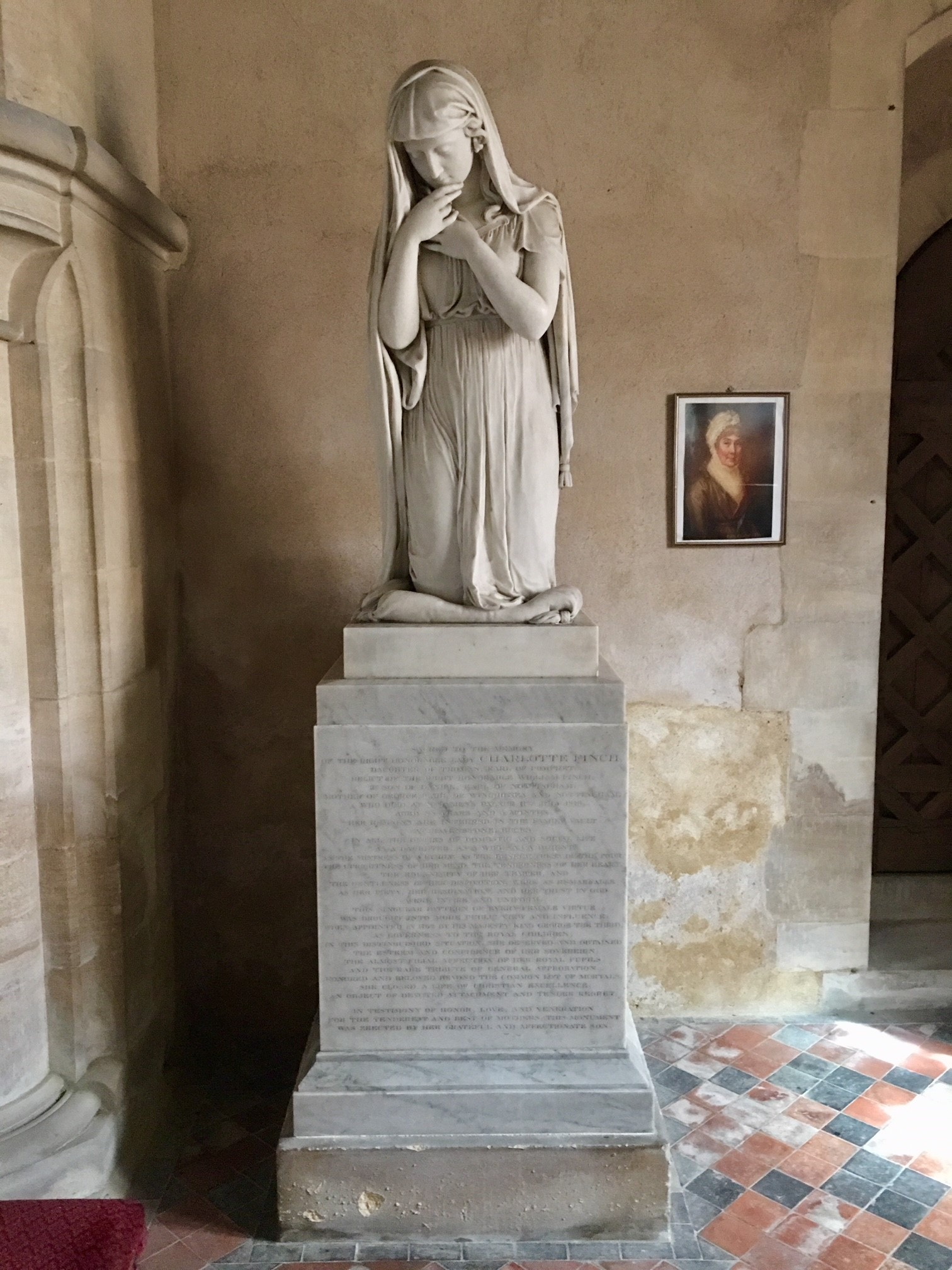
Memorial to Lady Charlotte Finch in Holy Cross Church, Burley, Rutland

By 1792, Lady Charlotte Finch had become ill and deaf. Princess Sophia remarked that autumn, "I am grieved to death about her, she is if possible more kind to us than ever. Indeed, both [Mrs Gouldsworthy] and her are so good to us that we should not be deserving of having such treasures about us, if we did not feel their kindness in the highest degree". Finch resigned from her role in November 1792 and retired on 5 January 1793, though she continued to correspond with members of the royal family and receive gifts from them, particularly the Prince of Wales, the future George IV. She received £600 in yearly payment, supplemented by income from the South Sea Company, until her death on 11 July 1813 at St James's Palace.

She was buried in the family vault at Ravenstone, Buckinghamshire and five royal dukes attended her funeral. Her youngest daughter was allowed to maintain their apartments at St James's. Her will was mainly portioned out between her three surviving children. Her memorial by Francis Leggatt Chantrey (1820), is in Holy Cross Church, Burley, adjacent to Burley House, the Rutland mansion of her son, George Finch, 9th Earl of Winchilsea.

== Issue ==
- Charlotte Finch (b. 1 September 1747).
- Sophia Finch (b. 17 October 1748), married Captain Charles Fielding in 1772 and had issue.
- Frances Finch (23 September 1749 –1765).
- Henrietta Finch (b. 28 December 1750).
- George Finch, 9th Earl of Winchilsea (4 November 1752 – 2 August 1826).

== Notes ==
Works cited

- Black, Jeremy (2006). George III: America's Last King. Yale University Press. ISBN 0-300-11732-9.
- Debrett, John (1814). The Peerage of the United Kingdom of Great Britain & Ireland. G. Woodfall.
- "Church of the Holy Cross, Burley". Heritage Gateway website. Heritage Gateway (English Heritage, Institute of Historic Building Conservation and ALGAO:England). 2006.
- Fraser, Flora (2004). Princesses: The Six Daughters of George III. John Murray. ISBN 0-7195-6109-4.
- Hibbert, Christopher (2000). George III: A Personal History. Basic Books. ISBN 0-465-02724-5.
- Massue, Melville Henry (2013) [1911]. The Plantagenet Roll of the Blood Royal: The Mortimer-Percy Volume. Heritage Books. ISBN 978-0788418723.
- Purdue, A.W. (2004). "George III, Daughters of (act. 1766–1857)". Oxford Dictionary of National Biography (online ed.). Oxford University Press. doi:10.1093/ref:odnb/59209. (Subscription, Wikipedia Library access or UK public library membership required.)
- Shefrin, Jill (2004). "Finch, Lady Charlotte (1725–1813)". Oxford Dictionary of National Biography (online ed.). Oxford University Press. doi:10.1093/ref:odnb/75524. (Subscription, Wikipedia Library access or UK public library membership required.)
- Smith, E. A. (1999). George IV. Yale University Press. ISBN 978-0300088021.
- Walpole, Horace (1843). Letters of Horace Walpole to Horace Mann 1760 – 1785, Volume 1. Richard Bentley.
- Walpole, Horace (1861). The Letters of Horace Walpole: Earl of Orford, Volume 2. Henry G. Bohn.
