= Kirby (surname) =

Kirby is a surname of Norse or Irish origin. The English surname of Norse origin is from the Old Norse "kirkja" + "býr", meaning "church" + "settlement". (Names ending in 'by' are typically Nordic, as seen in such Swedish place names as Visby, Hellingsby, etc.) The Irish surname is an anglicisation of Ó Ciarmhaic, which also takes the form Kerwick,

== People ==
- Abner Kirby (1818–1893), mayor of Milwaukee, Wisconsin
- Adam Kirby (born 1980s), jockey
- Alan Kirby (born 1977), Irish footballer
- Alex Kirby (disambiguation)
- Alister Kirby (1886–1917), British rower at the 1912 Summer Olympics
- Andy Kirby (1961–2002), stock car driver and motorcycle racer
- Bill Kirby (born 1975), Australian swimmer
- Bruce Kirby (disambiguation)
- Bruno Kirby (1949–2006), American film and television actor
- Cam Kirby (1909–2003), Canadian politician
- Cecil Kirby (born 1950), Canadian outlaw biker and criminal.
- Charles Kirk Kirby (1826–1910), American architect
- Chauncey Kirby, Canadian ice hockey player
- Claire Kirby (born 1987), New Zealand beauty queen
- Clay Kirby (1948–1991), Major League Baseball pitcher
- Connor Kirby (born 1998), English football player
- Dale Kirby (born 1971), Canadian politician
- David Kirby (disambiguation)
- David Kirby (journalist), journalist
- David Kirby (judge) (born 1943), judge of the Supreme Court of New South Wales
- David Kirby (poet) (born 1944), American poet
- Dean Kirby, American politician
- Dorothy Kirby, American golfer and sportscaster
- Doug Kirby (born 1957), American author
- Douglas Kirby (1943–2012), research scientist
- Durward Kirby (1912–2000), television personality
- Edmund Kirby (1838–1920), English architect
- Edward Kirby (1901–1968), American athlete
- Edward M. Kirby (1906–1974), American public relations manager and US Army colonel
- Eric Kirby (footballer) (1926–2018), English footballer
- Fran Kirby (born 1993), English footballer
- Frank E. Kirby (1849–1929), Detroit designer of steamships in the early 20th century
- Frank Howard Kirby (1871–1956), British soldier
- Frank Kirby (disambiguation)
- Fred Kirby (1910–1996), American country-and-western recording and performance artist and songwriter
- Gary Kirby (born 1967), Irish hurling manager and player
- Gene Kirby (1915–2011), American Major League Baseball announcer and front office executive
- George Kirbye (c. 1565–1634), English composer
- George Kirby (curator) (1845–1937), British academic and curator of the York Art Gallery
- George Hughes Kirby (1875–1935), American physician and psychiatrist
- George Kirby (comedian) (1923–1995), comedian
- George Kirby (footballer) (1933–2000), English football player and manager
- George Kirby (baseball) (born 1998), Major League Baseball pitcher
- Gerald Kirby (disambiguation)
- Gustavus Town Kirby (1874–1956), American lawyer
- Halder Kirby, Canadian ice hockey player
- Harold Kirby (zoologist) (1900–1952), Canadian-American zoologist and protistologist
- Harold James Kirby (1895–1956), lawyer, real estate agent, and political figure in Ontario
- Henry Kirby (1889–1976), English cricketer
- Jack Kirby (1917–1994), comic book artist
- Jake Kirby (born 1994), English football midfielder
- James Kirby (died 1915), American labor leader
- Jane Kirby, Canadian figure skater
- Jay Kirby (1920–1964), American actor
- Jim Kirby (1884–1971), inventor
- John Henry Kirby (1860–1940), American businessman
- John Joshua Kirby (1716–1774), British landscape painter, engraver, and writer
- John Kirby (artist) (born 1949), British painter
- John Kirby (attorney), US attorney involved in some famous trials and the namesake of Kirby, the video game character
- John Kirby (Canadian politician) (1772–1846), Canadian businessman and politician
- John Kirby (disambiguation)
- Jon Luke Kirby (born 1998), English rugby league player
- Joseph Coles Kirby (1837–1924), Australian Congregational minister
- Josh Kirby (1928–2001), British illustrator known for his Discworld covers
- Joshua Kirby (1716–1774), British artist
- Kathy Kirby (1938–2011), British singer
- Kayle Kirby (born 1998), Australian rules footballer
- Ken Kirby, Canadian-born actor and screenwriter
- Kenneth Kirby, South African chess master
- Kier M. Kirby, singer of Deee-Lite
- Lee-Ann Kirby (born 1987), Trinidad and Tobago cricketer
- Leyland Kirby (born 1974), English electronic musician
- Louis Kirby (1928–2006), British newspaper editor
- Luke Kirby (actor), Canadian film actor
- Luke Kirby (priest) (1540s–1582), Catholic Priest and martyr
- Malachi Kirby, British actor and writer
- Matt Kirby, Australian XR Festival & Qld XR Festival & Australian AI Festival Founder
- Micajah W. Kirby (1798–1882), New York politician
- Michael J. L. Kirby (born 1941), Canadian senator and Chair of the Mental Health Commission
- Michael Kirby (judge) (born 1939), Justice of the High Court of Australia
- Paul Kirby (born 1966), Australian politician
- Pauline Kirby (1905–1981), American army nurse
- Rene Kirby (1955–2025), American male actor
- Richard Kirby (arbitrator) (1904–2001), Australian arbitrator
- Robert Kirby (musician) (1948–2009), British-born arranger of string sections for rock and folk music
- Robert Kirby (cartoonist) (born 1962), American cartoonist
- Robion Kirby (born 1938), American mathematician
- Roger Kirby (born 1950), British urologist and surgeon
- Rome Kirby, American sailor
- Ryan Kirby (born 1974), English soccer player
- Sandra Kirby (born 1949), Canadian academic and rower
- Simone Kirby, Irish actress
- Stephen Kirby, American author and critic of Islam
- Steve Kirby (cricketer), English cricketer
- Steve T. Kirby (born 1952), Lieutenant Governor of South Dakota
- Stuart Kirby (born 1981), race car driver
- Sylvia Kirby (born 1956), American country singer
- Terry Kirby (born 1970), American football player
- Vanessa Kirby (born 1988), English actress
- Wallace W. Kirby (1881–1962), director of the Bureau of Engraving and Printing
- Wayne Kirby (born 1964), American baseball player and coach
- Will Kirby (born 1973), Big Brother contestant
- William C. Kirby (born 1950), Historian at Harvard University
- William F. Kirby (1867–1934), Senator from Arkansas
- William Forsell Kirby (1844–1912), later English entomologist
- William Kirby (author), Canadian author of The Golden Dog
- William Kirby (entomologist) (1759–1850), English entomologist

== Fictional characters ==
- The Kirby family in the play You Can't Take It with You
- Colonel Mike Kirby in the 1968 film The Green Berets, played by John Wayne
- Paul, Amanda and Eric Kirby, a family in the 2001 film Jurassic Park III
- The title character of Rip Kirby, an American comic strip

== See also ==
- Justice Kirby (disambiguation)
- Kerby
- Kerby (name)
- Kirby
- Kirkby (disambiguation)
