= Kirby House =

Kirby House may refer to:

== United Kingdom ==
- Kirby House, Coventry

== United States ==
- McKleroy-Wilson-Kirby House, Anniston, Alabama, listed on the NRHP in Calhoun County, Alabama
- Evans-Kirby House, Harrison, Arkansas, listed on the NRHP in Boone County, Arkansas
- Sage-Kirby House, Cromwell, Connecticut, NRHP-listed
- Thomas Kirby House, Kendrick, Idaho, NRHP-listed
- Judge Kirby House, Jeffersontown, Kentucky, listed on the NRHP in Jefferson County, Kentucky
- Jesse Kirby Springhouse, Bowling Green, Kentucky, listed on the NRHP in Warren County, Kentucky
- Kirby House (Live Oak, Florida), Historic architecture in Suwannee County, Florida
- Kirby House (Trinity, Louisiana), listed on the NRHP in Louisiana
- William R. Kirby Sr. House, Hillsdale, Michigan, NRHP-listed
- Josiah Kirby House, Wyoming, Ohio, NRHP-listed
- Nelson-Kirby House, Germantown, Tennessee, listed on the NRHP in Shelby County, Tennessee
- Maxwell-Kirby House, Knoxville, Tennessee, NRHP-listed
- Kirby-Hill House, Kountze, Texas, listed on the NRHP in Hardin County, Texas

== See also ==
- Kerby House, Prairieville, Alabama, NRHP-listed
- Kirby (disambiguation) § Buildings, for other buildings named "Kirby"
