= Kirby (given name) =

- Gender: Unisex
- Language: English

Origin
- Languages: Irish, Old Norse, English
- Origin: Kirby (surname)
- Region of origin: Ireland, England, Scandinavia

Other names
- Related names: Kerby, Kirkby

Kirby is a given name which may refer to:

== People ==
- Kirby Allan (1928–2011), American record producer
- Kirby Ian Andersen, Canadian musician
- Kirby Logan Archer (born 1971), American convicted criminal
- Kirby Ann Basken (born 1985), Norwegian model
- Kirby Bentley (born 1986), Australian rules footballer
- Kirby Bliss Blanton (born 1990), American actress
- Kirby Chambliss (born 1959), American pilot
- Kirby Dach (born 2001), Canadian ice hockey player
- Kirby Dick (born 1952), American filmmaker
- Kirby Lauryen Dockery, American singer-songwriter
- Kirby Doyle (1932–2003), American poet
- Kirby Freeman (born 1985), American football player
- Kirby Grant (1911–1985), American actor
- Kirby Gregory (born 1953), British musician
- Kirby J. Hensley (1911–1999), American religious leader
- Kirby Heyborne (born 1977), American actor, musician, singer, songwriter, narrator, and comedian
- Kirby Higbe (1915–1985), American right-handed starting pitcher
- Kirby Hocutt (born 1973), American sports director
- Kirby Howell-Baptiste (born 1987), English actress
- Kirby Larson (born 1954), American writer
- Kirby Law (born 1977), Canadian ice hockey player
- Kirby Mack (born 1983), American wrestler
- Kirby Morrow (born 1973–2020), Canadian performer
- Kirby Puckett (1960–2006), American baseball player
- Kirby Smart (born 1975), American football coach
- Kirby Smith (1824–1893), American army officer and professor
- Kirby Snead (born 1994), American baseball player
- Kirby Wilson (born 1961), American football coach
- Kirby Wright, American writer
- Kirby Yates (born 1987), American baseball player

== Fictional characters ==
- Kirby (character), the titular character of the Kirby video game series
- Sir Kirby, from Doc McStuffins
- Kirby Anders, on the 1980s soap opera Dynasty
- Kirby Buckets, the titular character in the live-action series of the same name
- Kirby Reed, from the Scream franchise

== See also ==
- Kirby (disambiguation)
