= Kerwick =

Kerwick is a surname derived from the Irish surname Ó Ciarmhaic, which is also anglicised as Kirby. Notable people with the surname include:

- Bill Kerwick (1867–1936), Irish hurler
- Edward Kerwick (1922–2010), English rugby league player
- John Kerwick (1893–?), Australian rugby league player
- Pat Kerwick (born 1982), Irish hurler
- Tom Kerwick (1885–1929), Irish hurler
