= Kirby =

Kirby may refer to:

== Arts and entertainment ==
- Kirby (series), a video game series
- "Kirby", a song from the album The Impossible Kid by Aesop Rock
- Kirby: Right Back at Ya!, a Japanese anime television series
- "Kirby" (Dynasty), an episode of the television series Dynasty
- Kirby: King of Comics, a 2008 biography by Mark Evanier
- Kirby Awards, presented from 1985 to 1987 for achievements in comic books

== Buildings ==
- Kirby Building, a skyscraper in Dallas, Texas, United States
- Kirby Hall, an Elizabethan country house near Corby, Northamptonshire, England
- Kirby House (disambiguation), various houses in England and the United States
- Kirby Sports Center, a sports arena in Easton, Pennsylvania, United States

== Businesses ==
- Kirby Building Systems, a manufacturer of pre-engineered buildings
- Kirby Company, an American manufacturer of vacuum cleaners, home cleaning products and accessories
- Kirby Corporation, an American liquid cargo barge operator

== Places ==
=== United States ===
- Kirby, Arkansas, an unincorporated census-designated place
- Kirby, Indiana, an unincorporated community
- Kirby, Missouri, an unincorporated community
- Kirby, Montana, a populated place
- Kirby, Ohio, a village
- Kirby, Texas, a city
- Kirby, Vermont, a town
- Kirby, West Virginia, an unincorporated community
- Kirby, Wisconsin, an unincorporated community
- Kirby, Wyoming, a town

=== England ===
- Kirby-on-the-Moor, also known as Kirby, a village in North Yorkshire
- Kirby-le-Soken, a village in Essex
- Kirby Muxloe, a village and civil parish west of Leicester
- Kirby Underdale, a village and civil parish in the East Riding of Yorkshire
- Monks Kirby, a village and civil parish in Warwickshire

=== Elsewhere ===
- Kirby, Ontario, a hamlet in Canada
- Kirby Cone, a peak in Marie Byrd Land, Antarctica
- 51985 Kirby, an asteroid named after Jack Kirby

== People and fictional characters ==
- Kirby (surname), including a list of people and fictional characters
- Kirby (given name), a list of people and fictional characters
- Kirby Howell-Baptiste, English actor credited mononymously as Kirby since 2023
- Kirby Lauryen, American singer-songwriter also known simply as Kirby
- Kirby (character), the protagonist of the Kirby video game series

== Schools ==
- Kirby College of Further Education, now part of Middlesbrough College, North Yorkshire, England
- Kirby High School (disambiguation), several schools in the United States

== Other uses ==
- Kirby (cucumber), used for pickling and slicing
- Kirby 23, a sailboat designed by Bruce Kirby and produced in the mid-1980s
- Kirby 25, a sailboat designed by Bruce Kirby and produced in the mid-1980s
- Kirby Forensic Psychiatric Center, a psychiatric hospital in New York City
- Loteki Supernatural Being (1990–2007), also known as Kirby, the only dog to have won all three major international dog shows in the same year

== See also ==
- Kirby calculus
- Kirby Krackle (or Kirby Dots), an artistic convention in comic books
- Kirby's Mill, an historic grist mill in Medford, New Jersey, United States
- Kirby's Pig Stand, the first drive-in restaurant in the United States
- Kerby (disambiguation)
- Kirkby (disambiguation)
