= Frank Kirby =

Frank Kirby may refer to:

- Frank Howard Kirby (1871–1956), English recipient of the Victoria Cross
- Frank Kirby (footballer) (1885–1963), Australian rules footballer
- Frank E. Kirby (1849–1929), naval architect
