= Kidby =

Kidby is a surname. Notable people with the surname include:

- D. J. Kidby (born 1987), Canadian curler
- Dustin Kidby (born 1985), Canadian curler
- Paul Kidby (born 1964), English artist

== See also ==
- Kirby (surname)
