= Kerby =

Kerby may refer to:

- Kerby (name)
- Kerby, California, a former settlement
- Kerby, Oregon, an unincorporated community
- Kerby, an unincorporated community in Caledonia Township, Shiawassee County, Michigan
- Kerby House, a historic Greek Revival plantation house and historic district in Prairieville, Alabama
- Kerby, a children's game in the United Kingdom where players take it in turns to throw a ball at a kerb and then catch it

== See also ==
- Kirby
- Kirby (surname)
- Kirkby (disambiguation)
