= Steve Kirby =

Steve Kirby may refer to:

- Stephen Kirby, American author and critic of Islam
- Steve T. Kirby (born 1952), 35th Lieutenant Governor of South Dakota
- Steve Kirby (musician) (born 1956), American jazz musician
- Steven Kirby (born 1977), English cricketer
- Steve Kirby (Washington politician) (born 1951), member of the Washington House of Representatives
