= Gretton, Northamptonshire =

English village

Coordinates: 52.5408°N 0.6671°W

Gretton
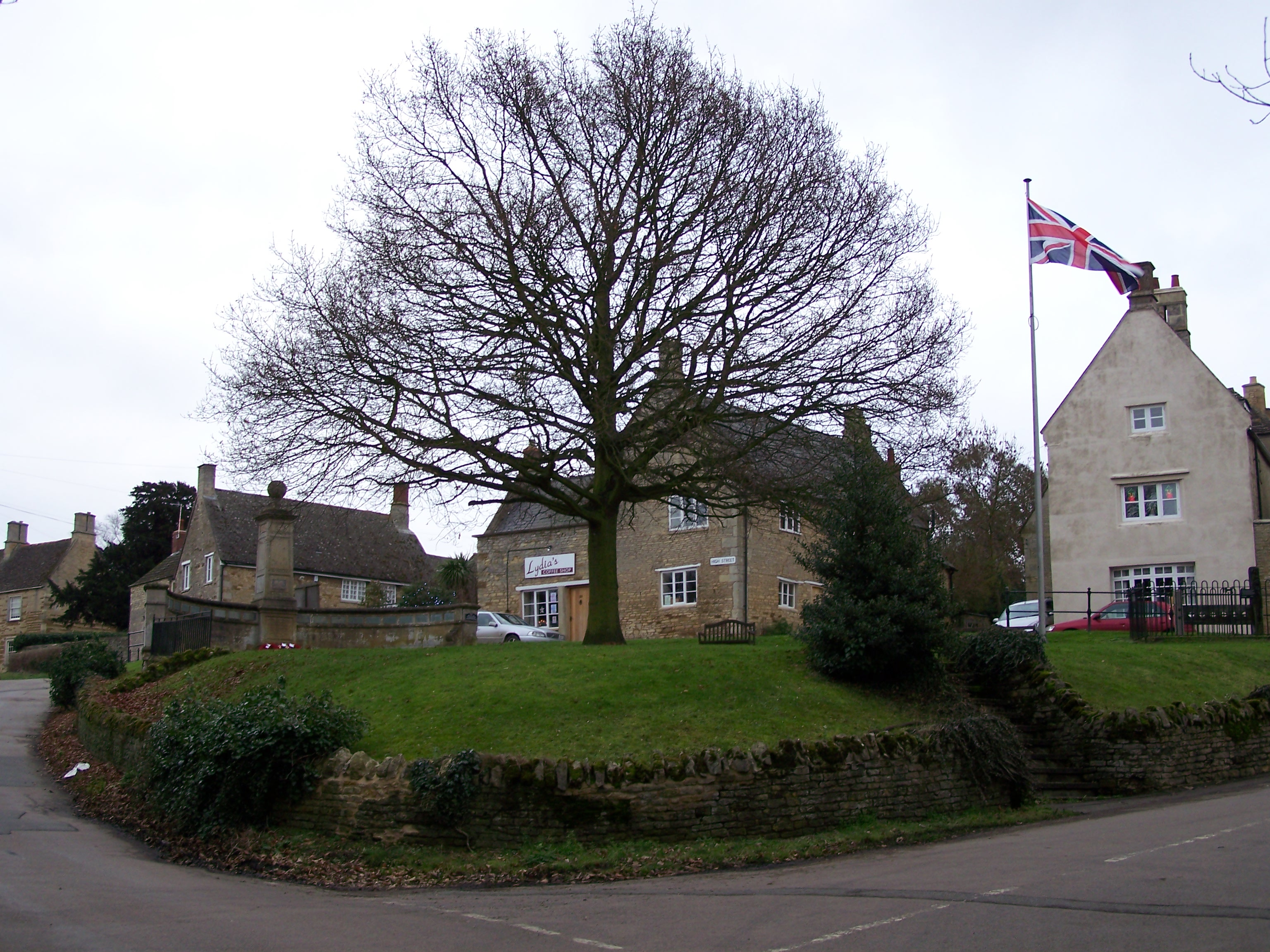
- Village green

- Location within Northamptonshire
- Population: 1,285 (2011)
- OS grid reference: SP9094
- Unitary authority: North Northamptonshire
- Ceremonial county: Northamptonshire
- Region: East Midlands
- Country: England
- Sovereign state: United Kingdom
- Post town: Corby
- Postcode district: NN17
- Dialling code: 01536
- Police: Northamptonshire
- Fire: Northamptonshire
- Ambulance: East Midlands
- UK Parliament: Corby and East Northamptonshire

Gretton is a village and civil parish in North Northamptonshire. It is in Rockingham Forest and overlooks the valley of the River Welland and the neighbouring county of Rutland. At the time of the 2001 census, the parish had a population of 1,240 people, increasing to 1,285 at the 2011 census.

== Geography ==
The village's name means 'gravel farm/settlement' or perhaps, 'great farm/settlement'.

It is near the town of Corby and the former Rockingham Motor Speedway.

== History ==
The village is noted for having the tallest church tower in Northamptonshire, and the second-oldest running pub in Northamptonshire, the Hatton Arms. The Hatton Arms was recently renovated. The pub was originally part of Carlton Manor gatehouse in the 12th century. James Chappell, a black servant who had saved the life of Christopher Hatton, 1st Viscount Hatton who lived in nearby Kirby Hall, is believed to have held the license.

Gretton is one of the few villages to retain its stocks and whipping post, which can be found on the village green. The last recorded use was in 1858, when a villager was put in the stocks for six hours after failing to pay a fine for drunkenness.

Iron currency bars from the Iron Age have been found. The Roman colonists also worked the ironstone deposits in this area. There were ironworks here in Edward the Confessor's reign in the 11th century, when Gretton was a royal manor. The industry came to the fore again from 1881 to 1980, providing ore for Corby's steel works.

== Landmarks ==
Tower of St James' Church

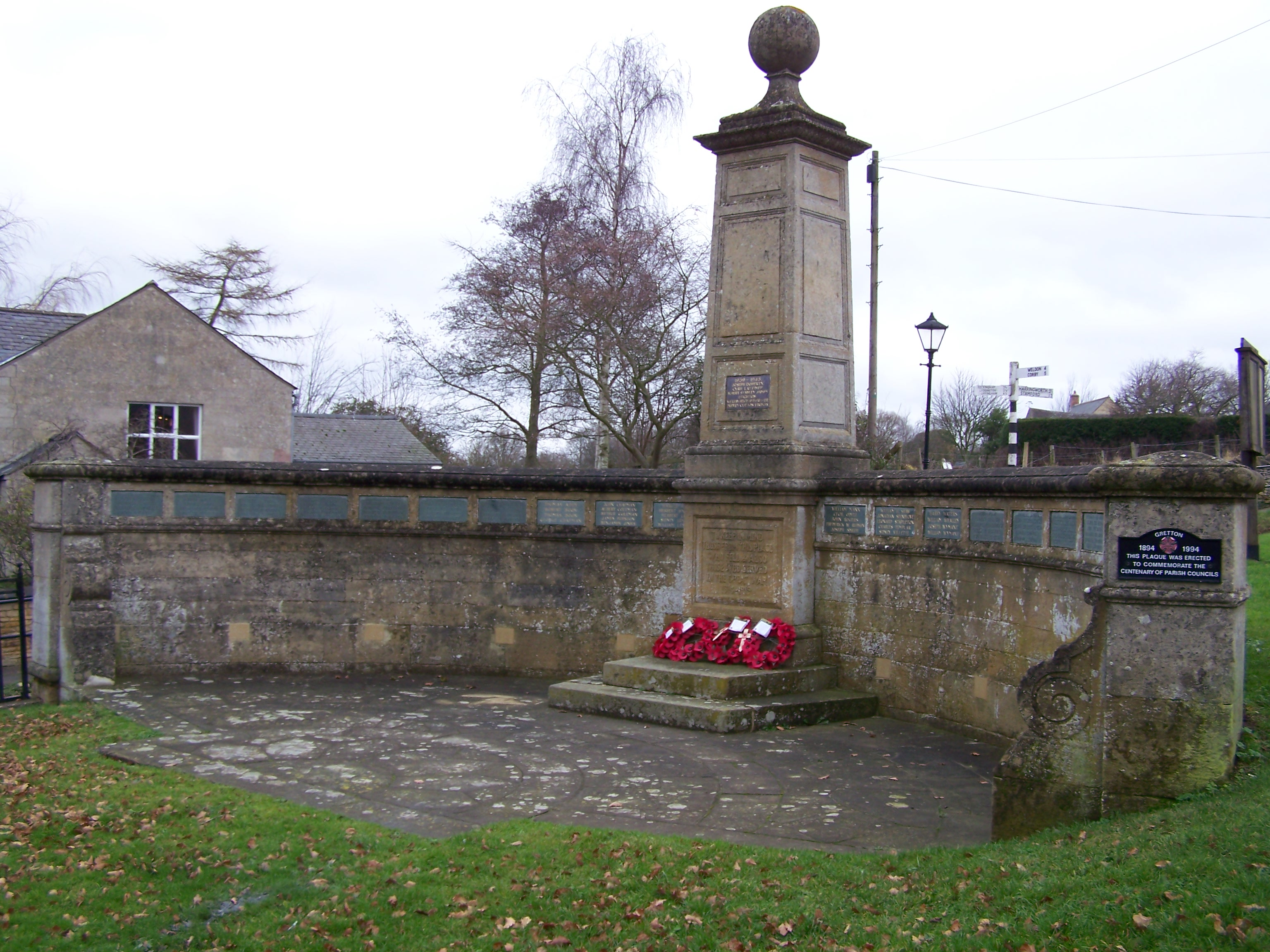
Gretton War Memorial

Most of the earlier houses – a fair number dating from the 17th century – are built of local limestone, sometimes banded with darker ironstone and roofed with thatch or Collyweston stone slate. The buildings in Gretton are of a wide variety in age and architectural style, ranging from the centuries-old 'Corner Cottage' in Arnhill Road, to a relatively modern housing estate on the south-east side of the village.

The Old School House, built in 1853, was the first purpose-built school in the village. The infants' classroom at the east end housed 70 children at times. The school operated until 1908, when the present school in Kirby Road was opened. Subsequently, it was used as the village community centre before being converted in the 1970s into a private house.

Stoneleigh House, in High Street, was formerly the premises of parchment makers. Springs were fed under the house into ponds which were used for soaking and cleaning the animal skins for preparation as parchment. Remnants of the drying sheds and other buildings still exist at the rear.

Opposite the village green is a stone-mullioned building, Tythe Farm. It has been considerably changed and extended, after having been in a serious state of disrepair during the last century. In 1919 the district surveyor found it to be unfit for human habitation. To the rear of the farm is the Tythe Barn (rebuilt after being destroyed by a fire in 1985), which used to store the 10% of village produce that was given by parishioners to the church.

The Post Office and Stores, in High Street, is part of a Victorian terrace called Pages Row. Formerly owned by a brewery, pigsties at the rear were rented out for sixpence a year. The Gretton Pig Club, in which owners and breeders traded information and sponsored breed improvements, operated from 1876 until 1977.

Overlooking the village green is the 'old' Gretton Stores (now Threeways), whose last storekeeper was Mr. Pegg. A fire in the early 1960s destroyed the upper floor and thatch.

This business was replaced by the 'newer' Gretton Stores. It was previously the White Hart pub, which closed in 1931. The Stores building is now used as a tea shop.

Stonycroft, in Station Road, is an 18th-century cottage. It has some narrow stone-mullioned windows, and a stonework panel over the door.

Gretton House, in High Street, is Georgian, but has a large neo-Jacobean addition of the 1880s. It was a family home until the Second World War, when it was requisitioned by the War Office as a military hospital. Following the war, it was converted for use as a convalescent home for employees of the Corby steel works. Since 1992 it has been a home for people with disabilities.

Manor Farmhouse, in High Street, is a good example of banded ironstone and limestone. It has a datestone of 1675. Originally called Warren Farm, it overlooked Warren Field. The names suggest that this was where the medieval manor obtained its rabbits.

The Old Vicarage, in Station Road, is 17th century with later additions. It was the vicarage until about 1830.

Gretton Primary School, in Kirby Road, built in 1908, has a stone bell tower and a schoolmaster's house. It is still the village school.
