= Gerald Kirby =

Gerald Kirby may refer to:

- Gerald Kirby, character played by Ricardo Montez
- Gerald Kirby (fl. 1970s), candidate for Ottawa Centre (provincial electoral district)

== See also ==
- Kirby (surname)
