= James Chappell (servant) =

English servant

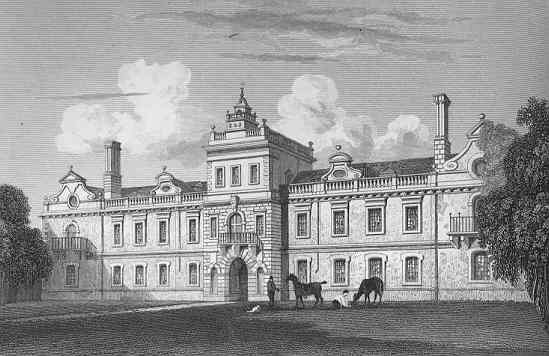
Kirby Hall, depicted in 1829

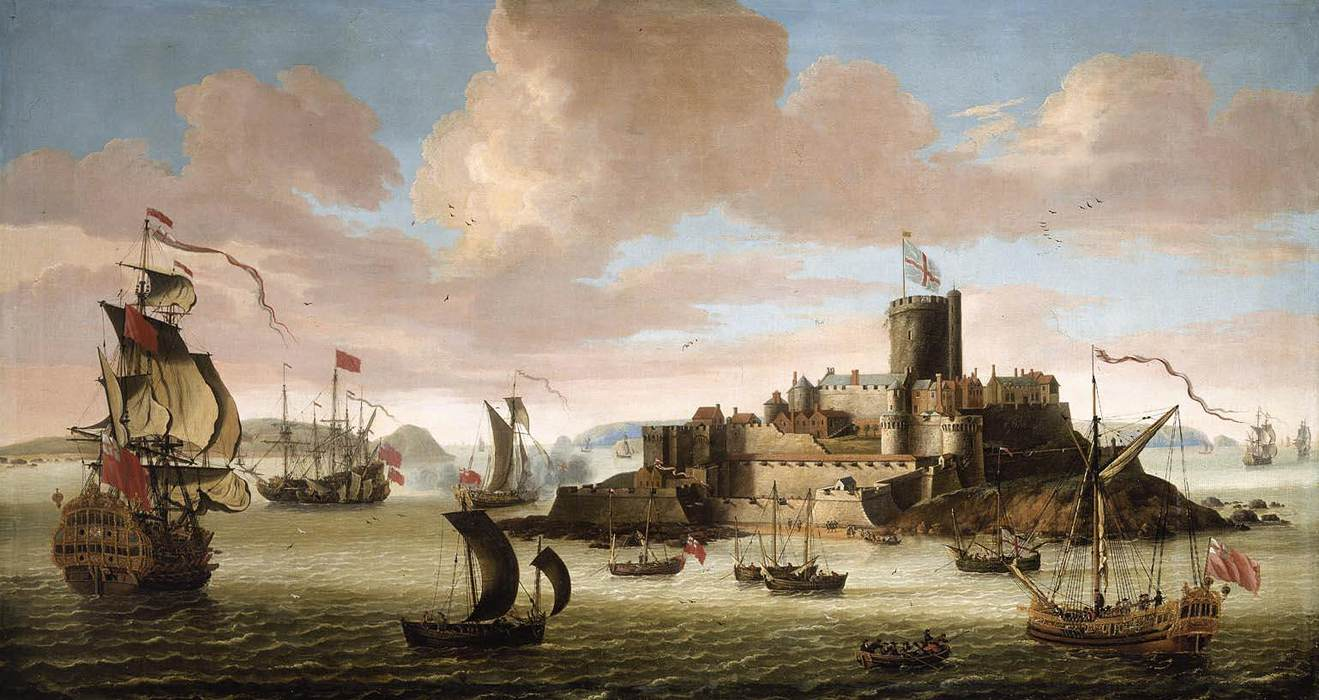
Late 17th-century depiction of Castle Cornet

James Chappell (1648–1730) was an English servant of Sir Christopher Hatton. Chappell saved the life of Hatton and his three young daughters in a 1672 explosion at Castle Cornet in Guernsey. Hatton awarded Chappell a £20-a-year pension in his will which he used to set up a household and become landlord of a public house. Chappell is thought to have been the first black English landlord.

== Biography ==
The Hatton Arms in Gretton, Northamptonshire

James Chappell was born in 1648 and, at the age of 15, joined the household of Sir Christopher Hatton as a servant at Kirby Hall, Northamptonshire. Chappell accompanied Hatton and his family to Guernsey when Hatton was appointed governor of Guernsey in 1670.

The official residence of the governor was Castle Cornet in the Little Roussel. It was struck by lightning in 1672 which ignited a store of gunpowder, triggering a large explosion that killed Hatton's wife and mother. Chappell pulled Hatton and his three young daughters from the rubble, saving their lives. Hatton and his household, including Chappell, returned to England later that year and stayed briefly in London, and Chappell's marriage to Elizabeth is likely to be that of "Jacobi Chappell" recorded in the 1672 parish register of St Martin-in-the-Fields, Westminster. Chappell and Elizabeth had a daughter, also named Elizabeth, who was baptised in Gretton, near Kirby Hall, on 10 September 1676. This child died young and was buried in 1679.

Chappell was named as a beneficiary in Hatton's 1695 will, being entitled to a pension of £20 a year for the remainder of his life after Hatton's 1706 death. Such a sum was a lifechanging amount in this period, especially as most black servants would neither have been paid nor free to leave service.

Chappell's wife died in 1704 and he remarried the following year to Mercy Peach; together they had one daughter, Amey. At this time a Thomas Peach, likely to have been Mercy's father or brother, was the licensee of the Hatton Arms. Chappell used his pension to establish a household near Kirby and became landlord of a public house, which local legend states was the Hatton Arms. Chappell is believed to have been the first black landlord in England. He died in 1730.

In 2021 Chappell was featured in an English Heritage exhibition on the African diaspora in English history. A fictionalised painting of Chappell in later life was commissioned from Glory Samjolly, who used a black male model's likeness as Chappell and exhibited at Kirby Hall in June 2021.
