= Bruce Kirby =

Bruce Kirby may refer to:

- Bruce Kirby (actor) (1925–2021), American actor
- Bruce Kirby (yacht designer) (1929–2021), Canadian yacht designer

== See also ==
- Bruce Kirkby (born 1968), Canadian adventurer
- Kirby (surname)
