= Alex Kirby =

Alex Kirby may refer to:

- Alex Kirby (journalist) (1939–2025), British journalist
- Alex Kirby (Blue Heelers), a fictional character from Australian television series Blue Heelers
