= Kerby (name) =

Kerby is both a surname and a given name. Notable people with the name include:

Surname:

- Kerby (Ipswich martyr) (died 1546)
- Edwin Kerby (1885–1971), Australian politician
- Harold Spencer Kerby (1893-1963), Royal Air Force Air Vice-Marshal who commanded British air forces in East Africa during the Second World War
- Henry Kerby (1914–1971), British Conservative Member of Parliament
- Trey Kerby (born 1984), American sports blogger
- William F. Kerby (1908–1989), chairman and CEO of Dow Jones & Co. and publisher of The Wall Street Journal
- William J. Kerby, (1870-1936) writer, sociologist and Catholic social worker

Given name:

- Kerby Farrell (1913–1975), minor league baseball manager
- Kerby Joseph (born 2000), American football player
- Kerby A. Miller, American historian
- Kerby Raymundo (born 1981), Filipino basketball player

Fictional characters:

- George and Marion Kerby, lead characters in the 1937 film Topper

== See also ==
- Bernadine Oliver-Kerby (born 1971), broadcaster
- Kerby
- Kirby
- Kirby (surname)
- Kirkby (disambiguation)
