= Frank Kirby (footballer) =

Personal information
- Full name: Frank Gordon Kirby
- Born: 22 September 1885; Fitzroy, Victoria
- Died: 20 March 1963 (aged 77); Camberwell, Victoria
- Original team: Korumburra / Bendigo

Playing career^{1}
Years	Club	Games (Goals)
1908	University	1 (0)
- ^{1} Playing statistics correct to the end of 1908.

Frank Gordon Kirby (22 September 1885 – 20 March 1963) was a teacher, librarian and an Australian rules footballer in Victoria, Australia.

== Football career ==
Kirby played with University in the Victorian Football League (VFL). After making a solitary appearance against Fitzroy in University's first VFL season, he commenced his career as a librarian and teacher.

== Academic career ==
Kirby worked as a librarian at the Public Library of Victoria. He wrote a report on secondary school libraries in Victoria in 1945, commissioned by the Australian Institute of Librarians (Victorian Branch) and the Australian Council for Educational Research.

He joined the staff of Scotch College in 1920 and was a librarian and teacher there for 35 years until his retirement in 1955. He was passionate about the French language, a member of Alliance Francaise and author of a French language textbook.

He died suddenly in Camberwell in 1963.
