= Kirby Hall =

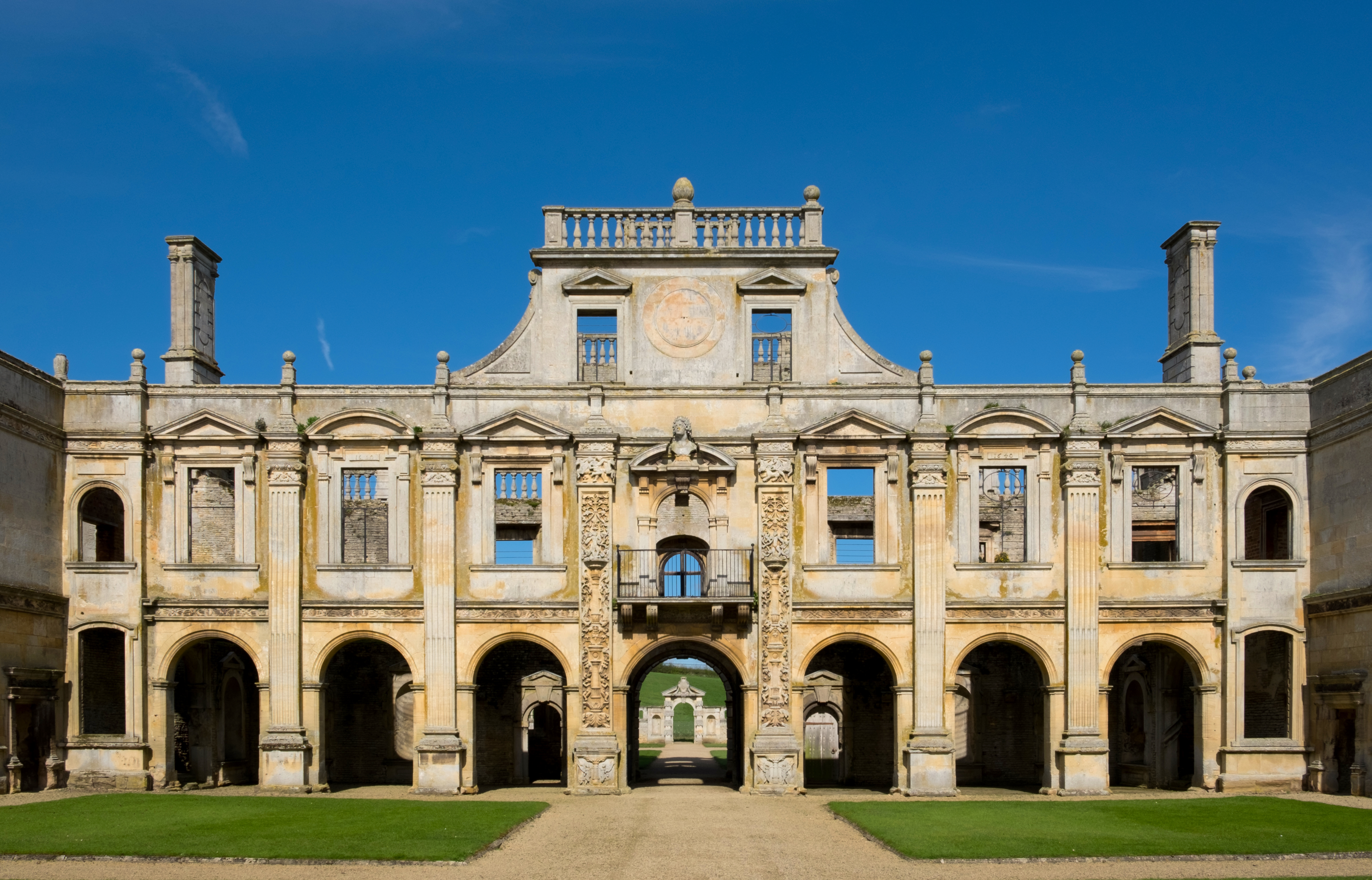
- Kirby Hall in 2016

- Location within Northamptonshire

General information
- Type: Country house
- Location: Gretton, Northamptonshire
- Coordinates: 52°31′27″N 0°38′14″W
- Completed: 17th century
- Owner: Earl of Winchilsea, English Heritage

Kirby Hall is a Grade I listed Elizabethan country house, located near Gretton, Northamptonshire, England. The nearest main town is Corby. One of the great Elizabethan houses of England, Kirby Hall was built in 1570 for Sir Humphrey Stafford of Blatherwycke. In 1575, Sir Christopher Hatton of Holdenby purchased the property, Hatton was Lord Chancellor to Queen Elizabeth I. It is a leading and early example of the Elizabethan prodigy house. Construction on the building began in 1570, based on the designs in French architectural pattern books and expanded in the Classical style over the course of the following decades. The house is now in a semi-ruined state with many parts roof-less although the Great Hall and state rooms remain intact. The gardens, with their elaborate "cutwork" design, complete with statues and urns, have been recently restored.

== History ==
Elizabeth Vaux, a Catholic recusant leased the hall in 1599, intending to establish John Gerard and other priests in a college in the house. The Privy Council heard of the plan and raided Kirby Hall, hoping to capture the priests, who, with exception of Hugh Sheldon, evaded the search. Abandoning her plans for Kirkby, Vaux extended her house at Harrowden instead.

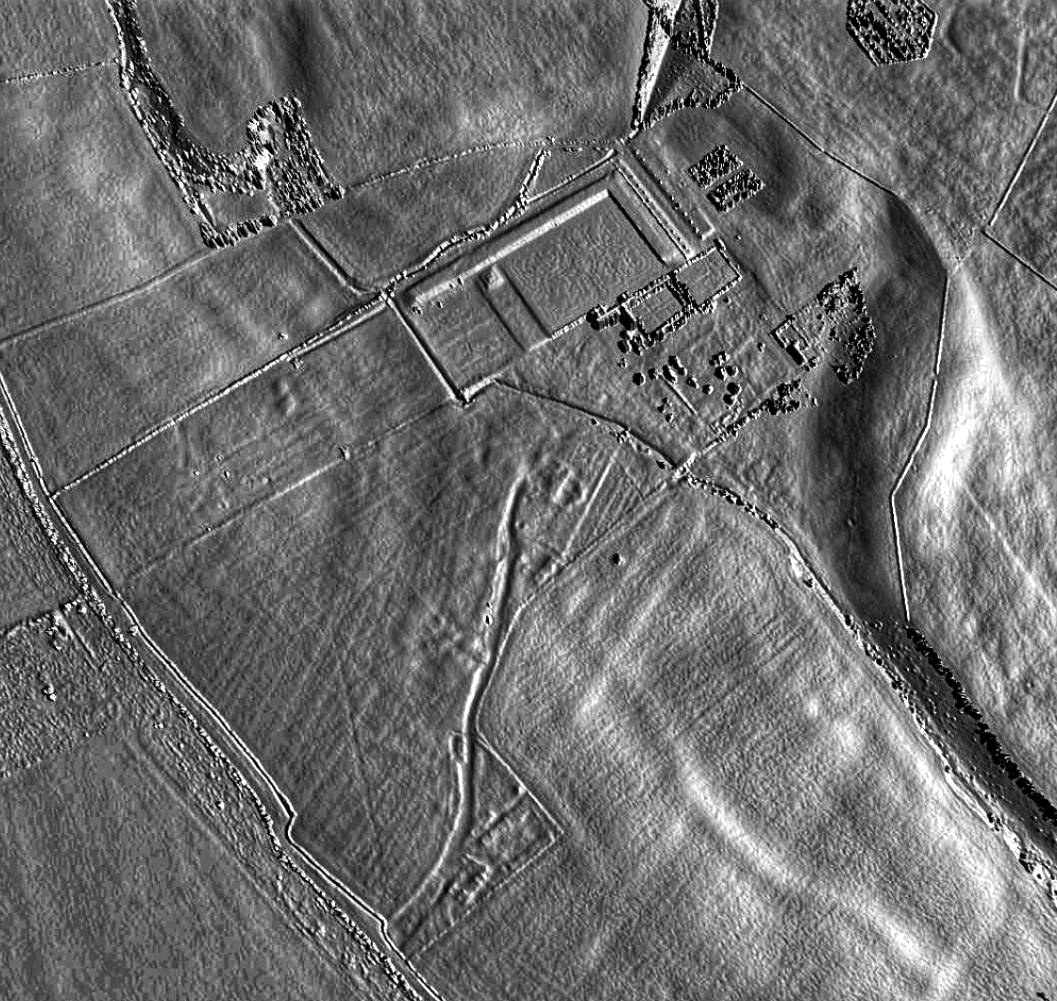
A lidar view of Kirby Hall and the site of Kirby Medieval village and a Roman enclosure in Northamptonshire

Anne of Denmark stayed at Kirby on 9 August 1605 while her husband King James I stayed at Rockingham Castle. James I stayed nine times at Kirby Hall between 1608–1624, one of them in August 1616 for three days. During a royal progress Esmé Stewart, 3rd Duke of Lennox died at Kirby of the "spotted ague" on 30 July 1624.

Kirby Hall was eventually inherited by Edward Finch, the youngest son of Daniel Finch, 2nd Earl of Nottingham and 7th Earl of Winchilsea and Anne Hatton, sole heiress to the 1st Viscount Hatton. Edward's eldest son, George Finch-Hatton married Lady Elizabeth Murray, daughter of the 2nd Earl of Mansfield. In 1791, their eldest son and heir George (later 10th Earl of Winchilsea) was born at Kirby Hall.

During the 1780s, George Finch-Hatton had begun renovating the hall's interior drastically into 18th-century style while preserving the exterior intact, he removed and sold the Tudor wood panelling, in exchange for wallpaper and pediment. The Hall began its slow decline when George and Lady Elizabeth's newly built palatial mansion Eastwell Park was finished and the family moved there entirely.

By the late 1880s, the hall had been completely abandoned and in ruins, the 12th Earl of Winchilsea, uncle to Denys Finch Hatton, dreamed to preserve and "if ever his ship came in" to restore the ancestral property to its old splendour, he was never able to carry out his dream. He died in 1898 and the title passed to his brother, Denys's father.

The building and gardens are still owned by the Earl of Winchilsea. The site was designated a scheduled monument in 1927.

Kirby Hall has been used as a filming location in many productions. These include: episode 6 ("Protest and Communication") of Kenneth Clark's Civilisation, and Patricia Rozema film adaptation of Jane Austen's Mansfield Park (1999) and A Christmas Carol for Ealing Studios in 1999. In 2014 it was the venue for two editions of BBC One's Antiques Roadshow.

== Images ==
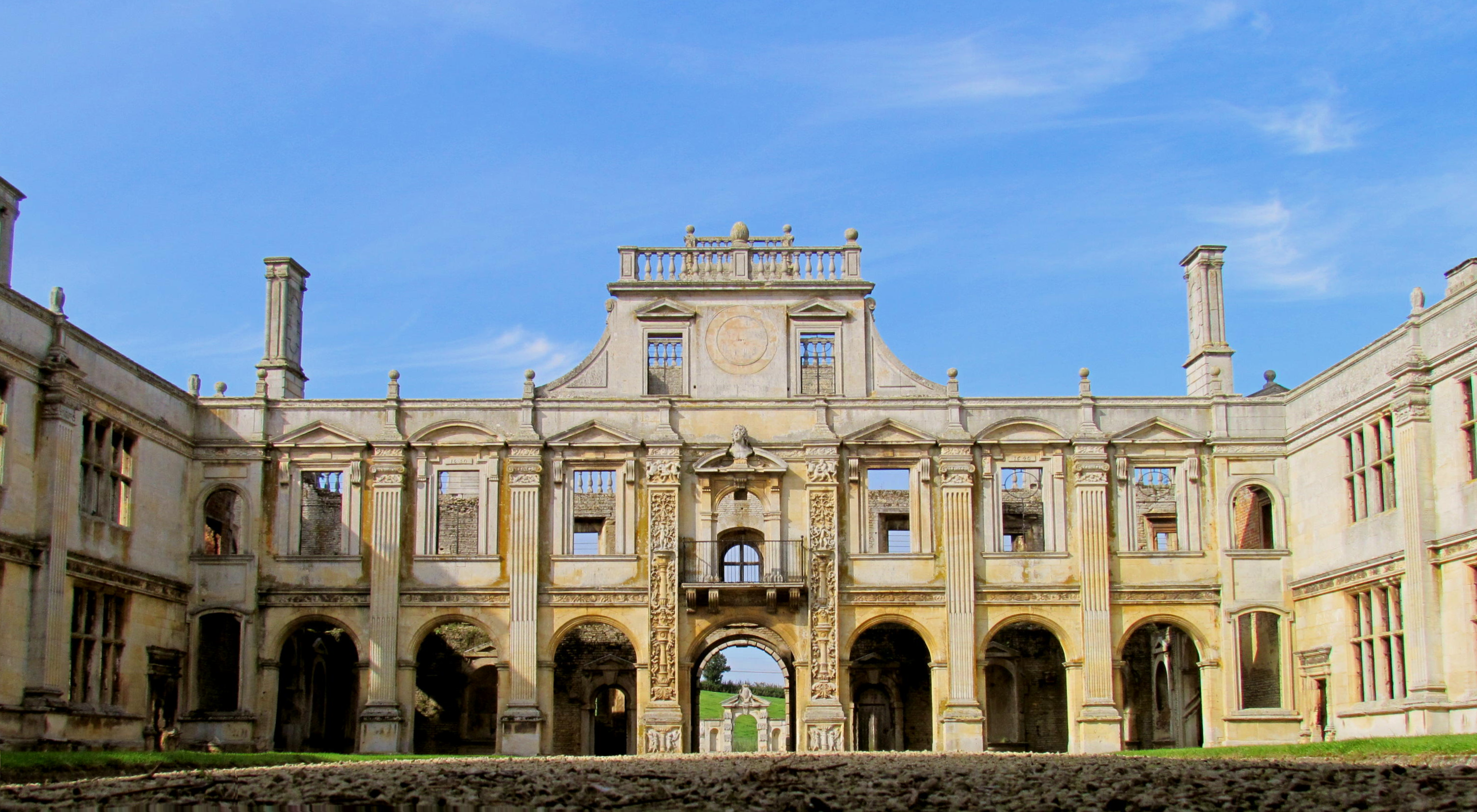
The giant order is very early in England, above the balcony there is a bust of Apollo.

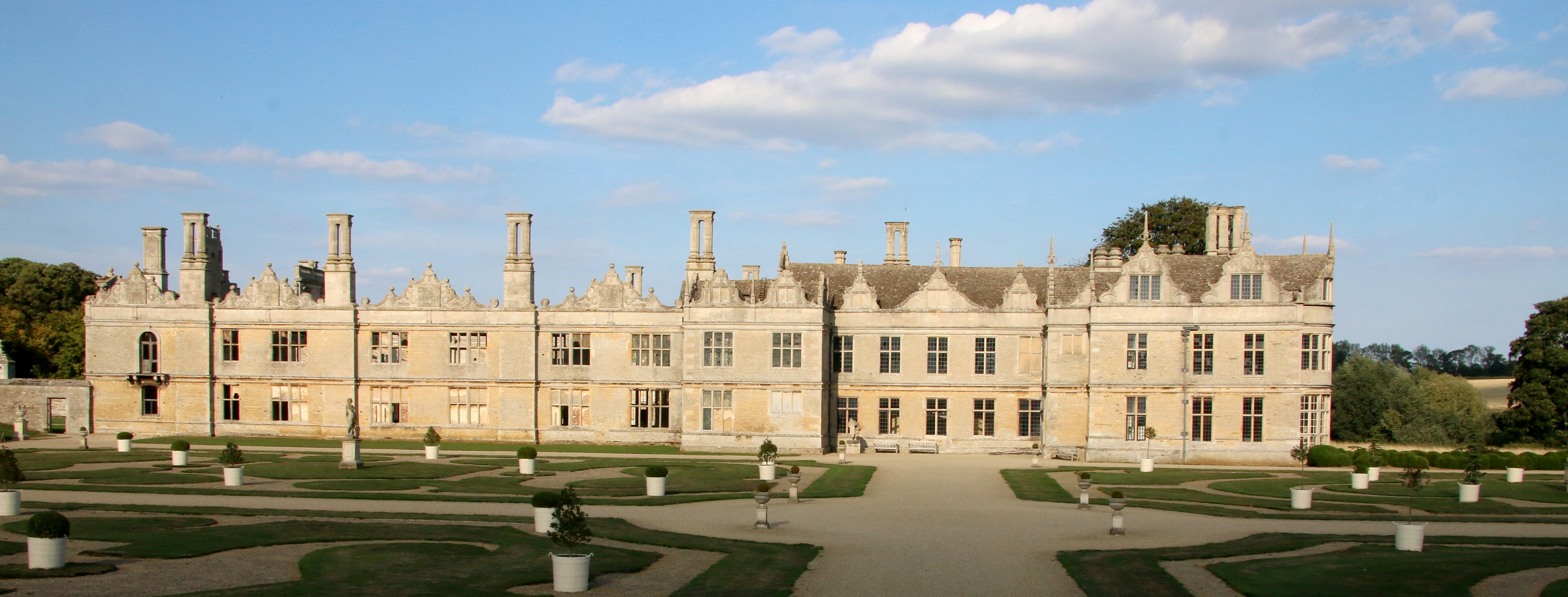

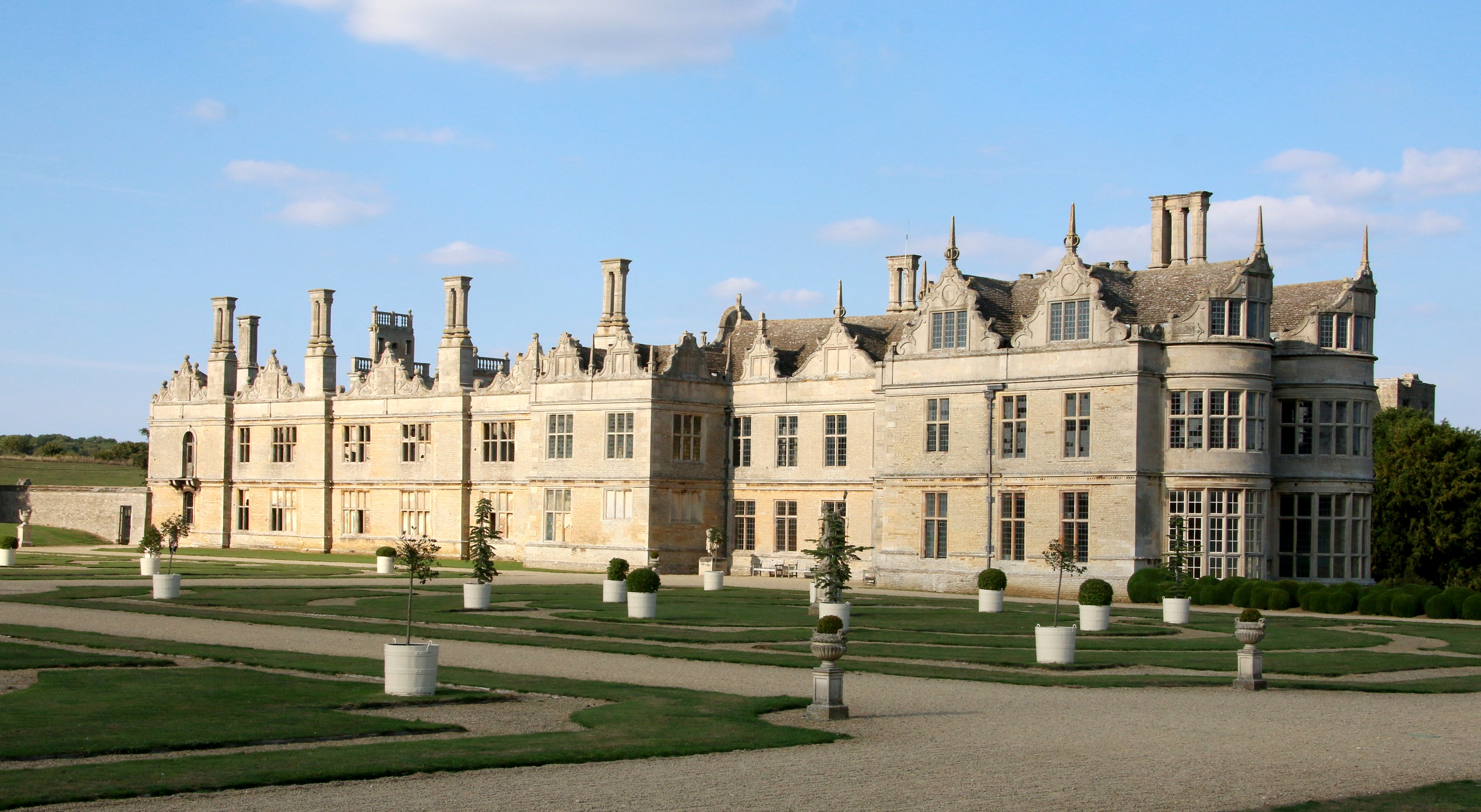

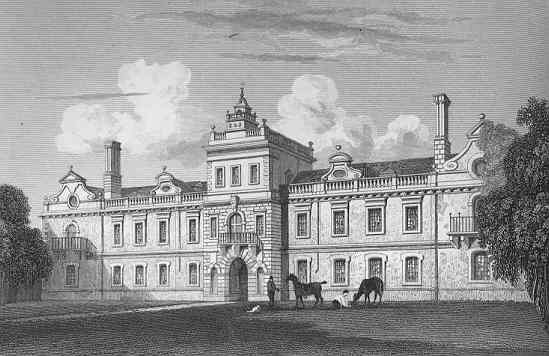
Kirby Hall in 1829 (gate courtyard)

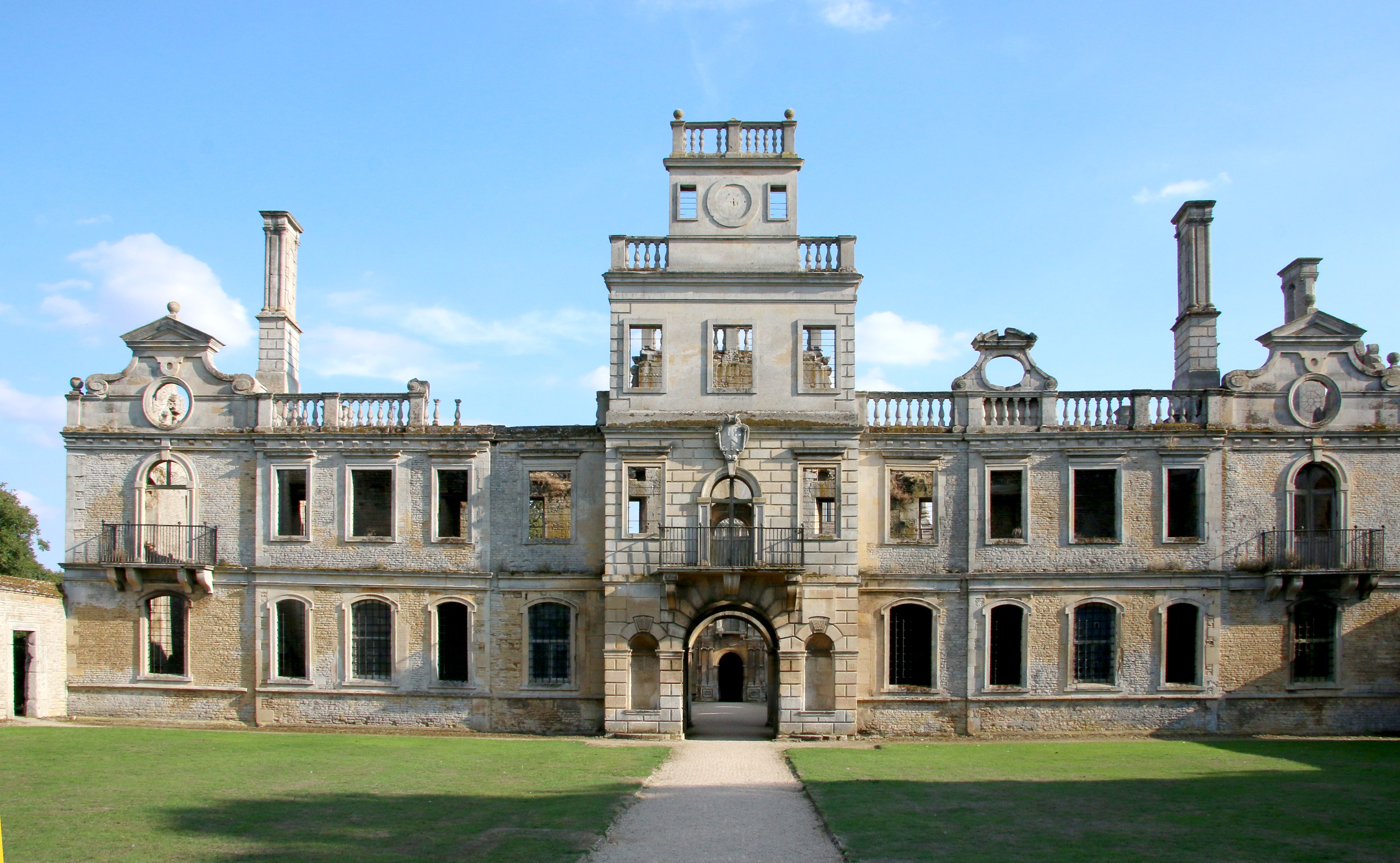
North outer courtyard gate, used to have a clock and bell tower.

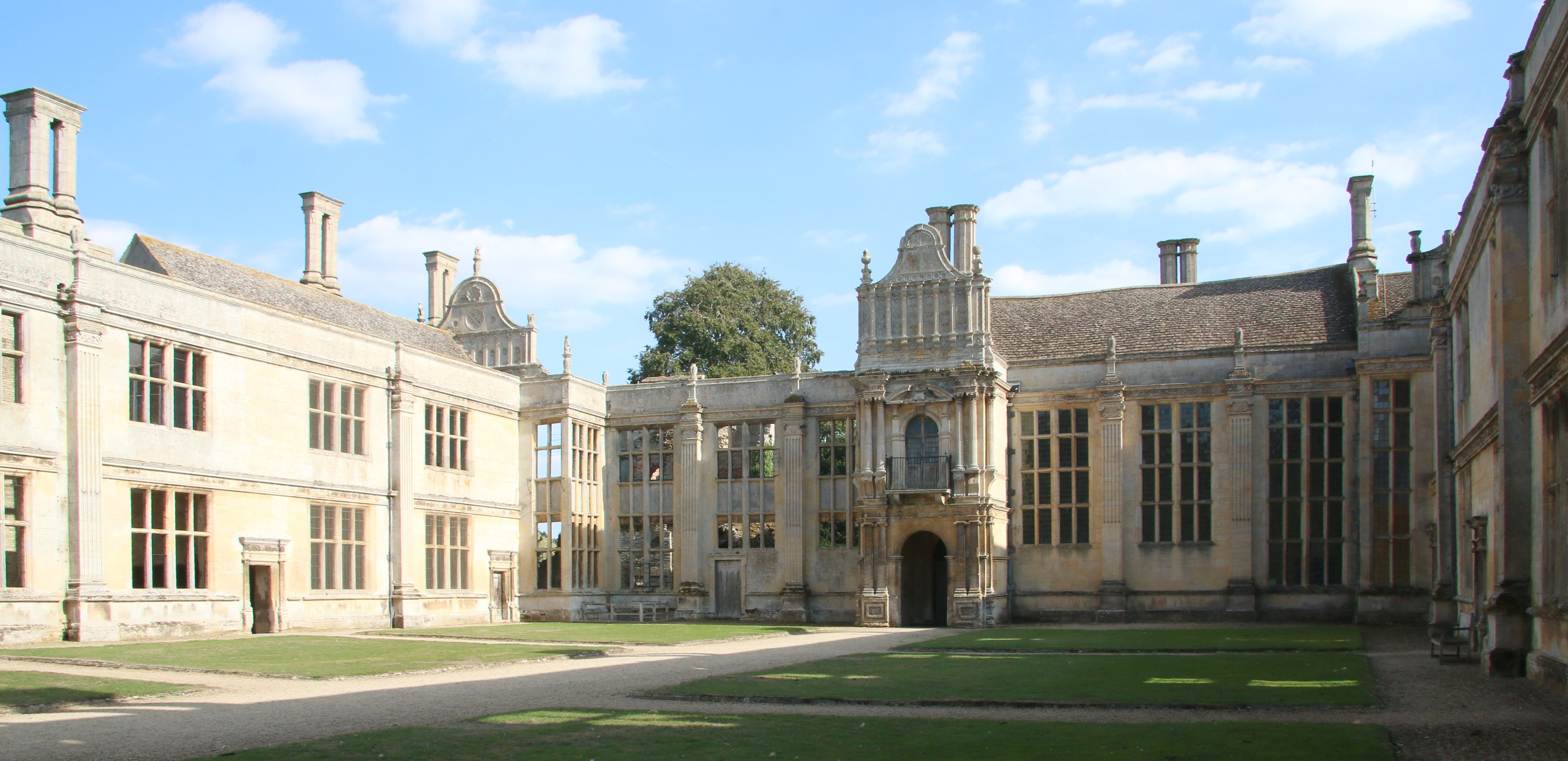
other facade of the giant order (Courtyard)

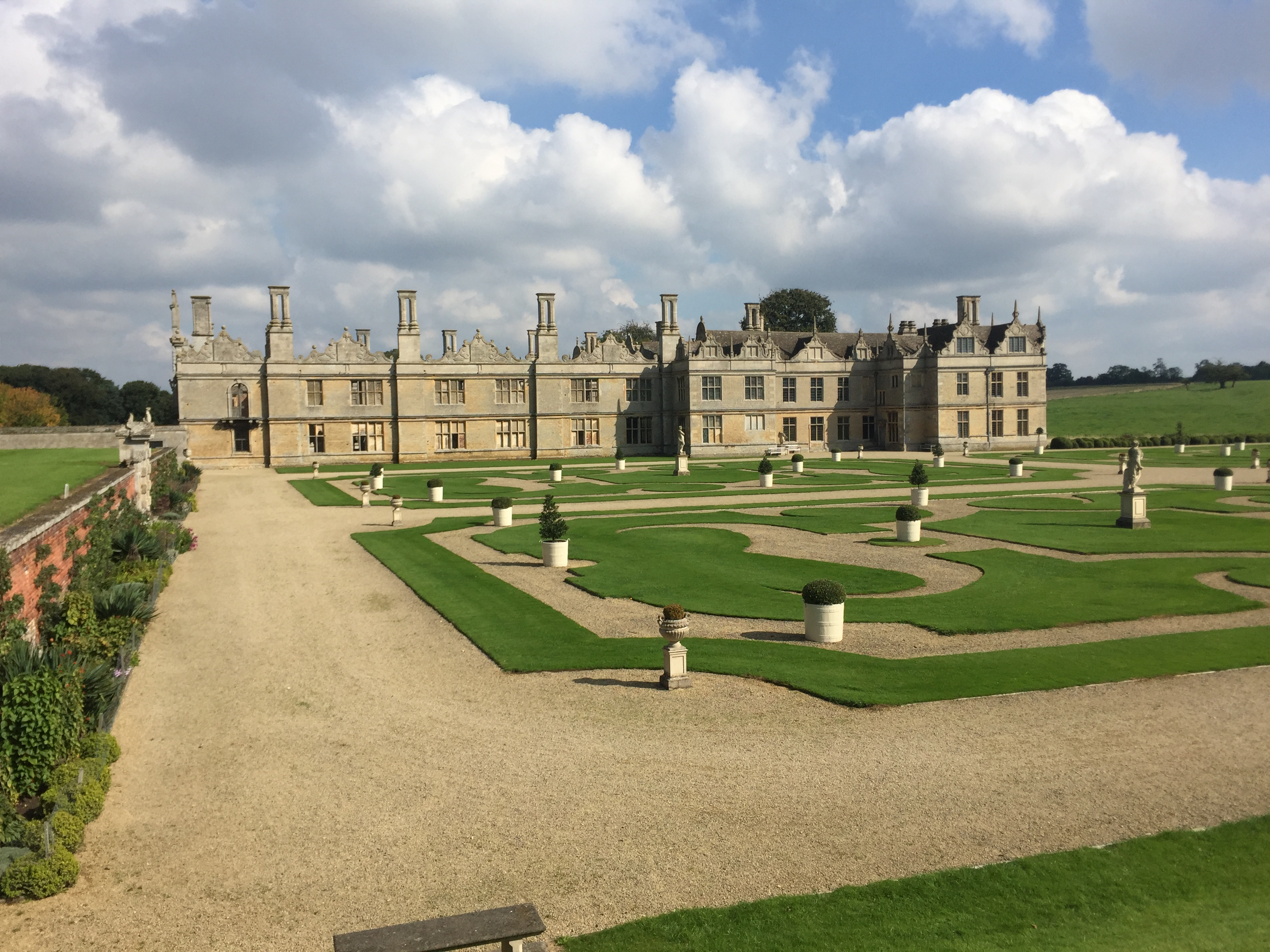
Raised Terrace

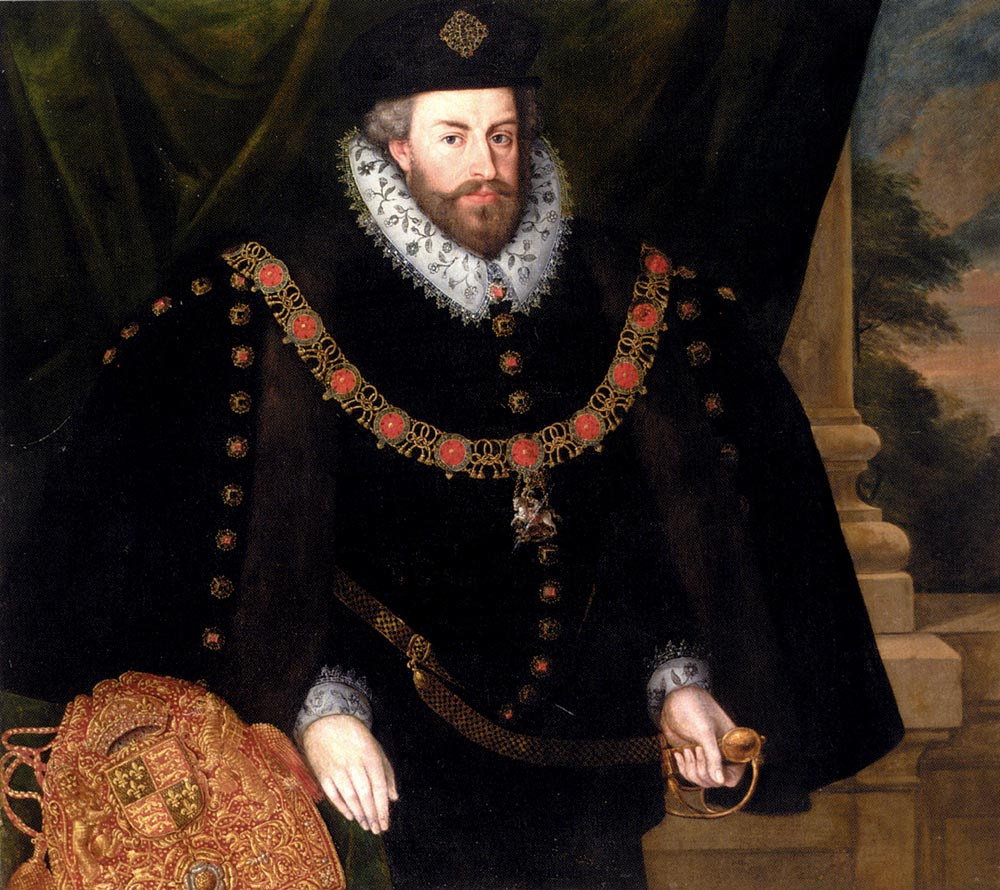
Sir Christopher Hatton in Lord Chancellor attire

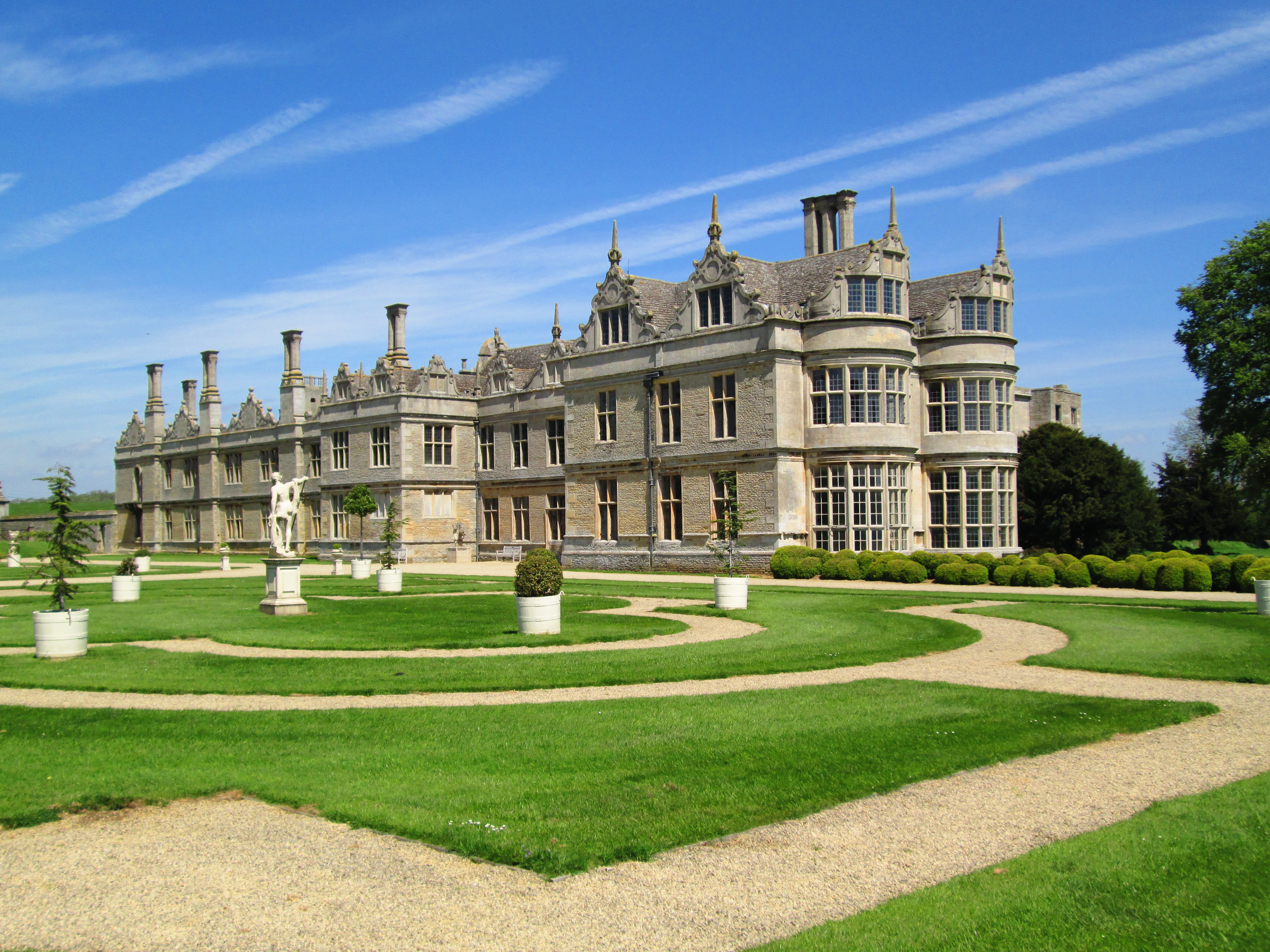
Oblique view (side & rear)

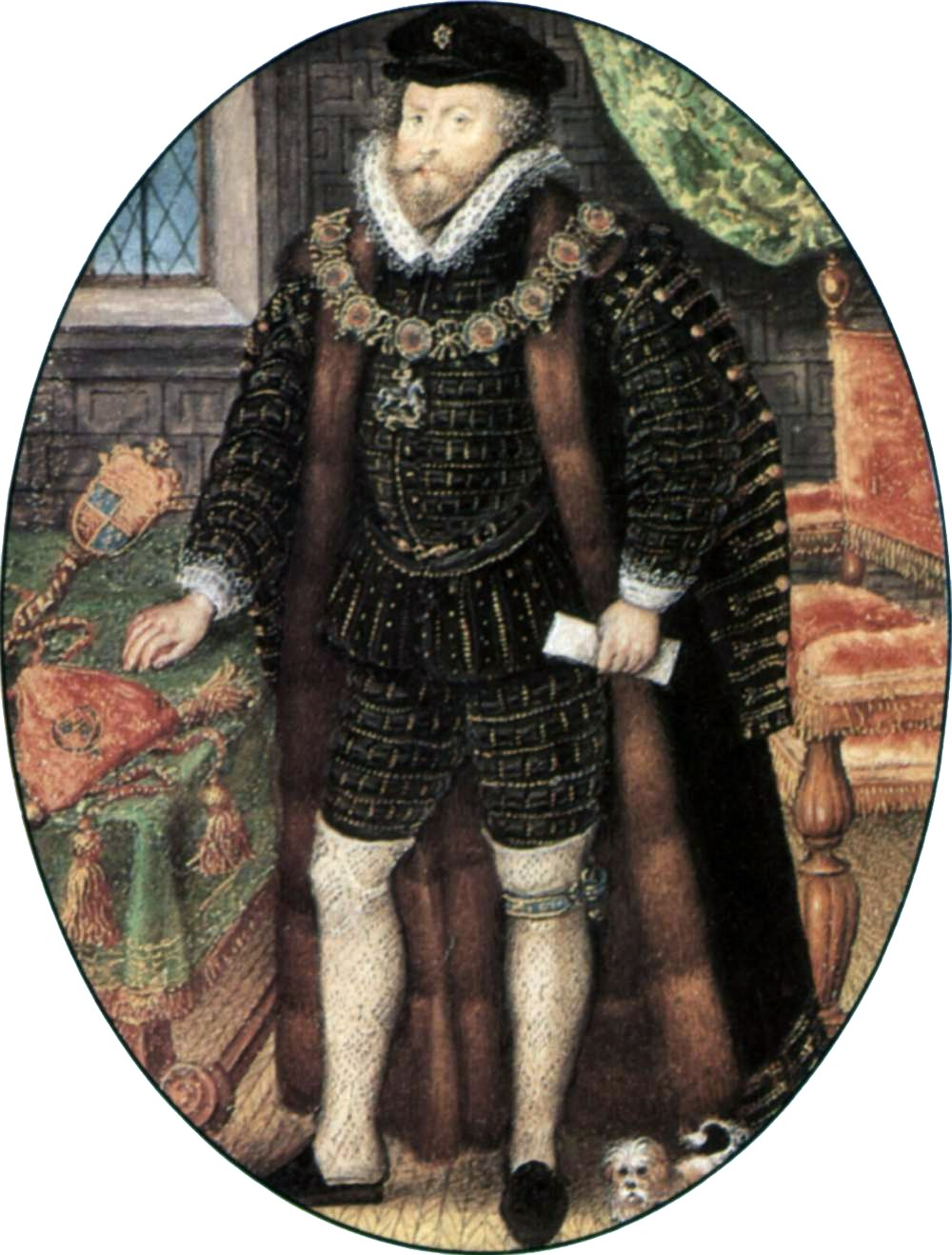
The builder, Christopher Hatton with his dog by Nicholas Hilliard, 1588-1591

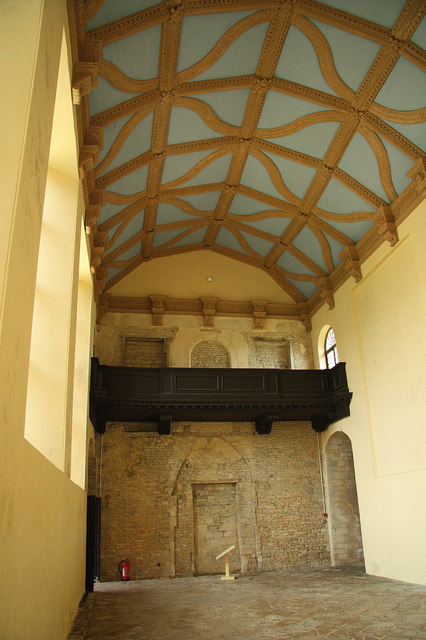
Great Hall

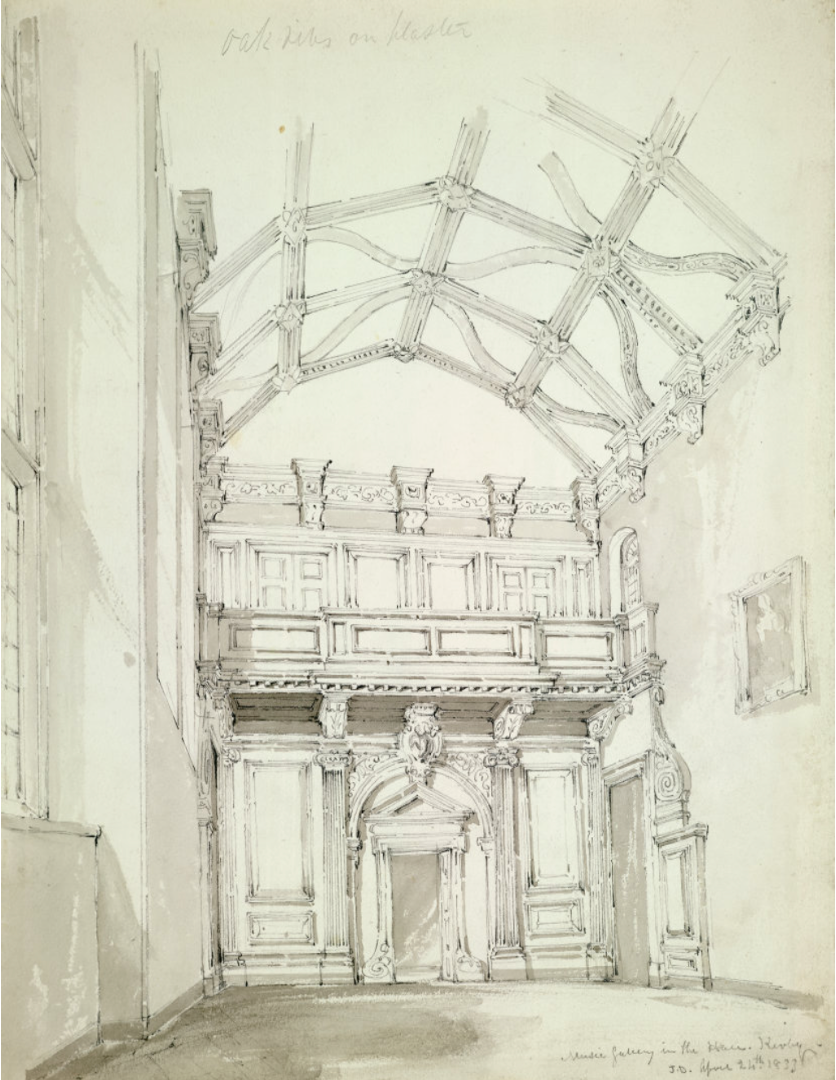
Great Hall c.1833

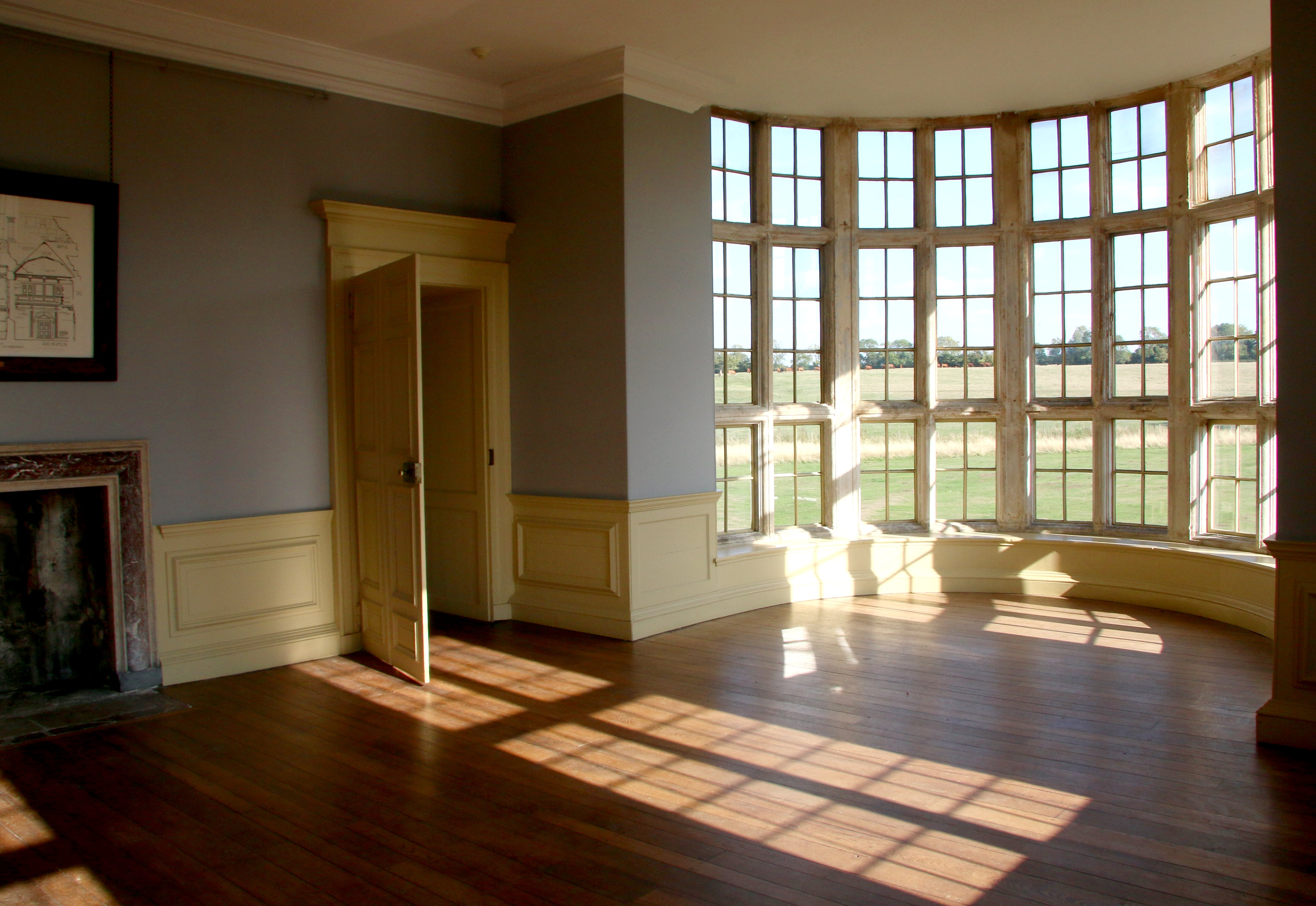
renovated as library by George Finch Hatton

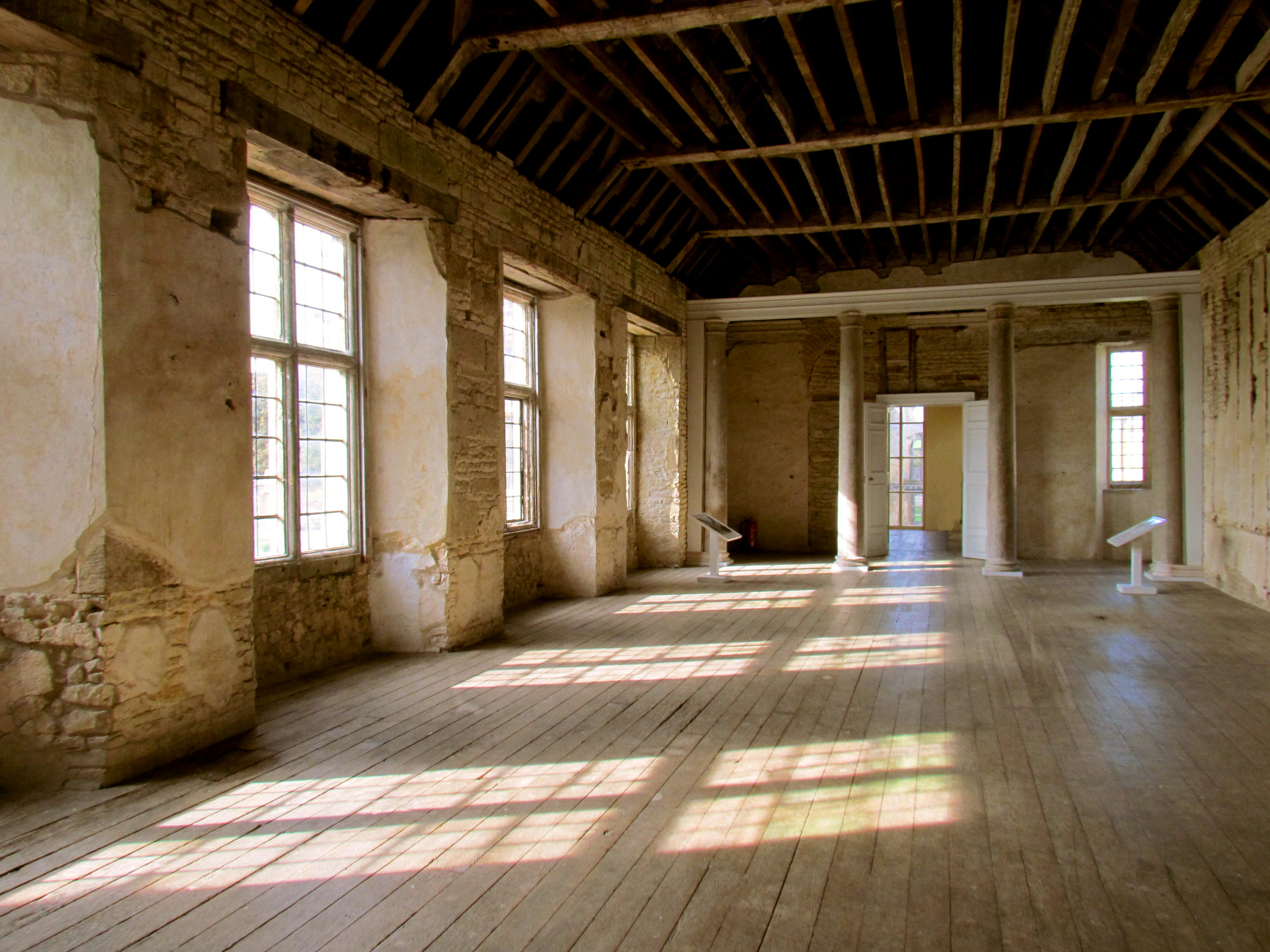
used as ballroom by George FH and Lady Elizabeth (disrepair)

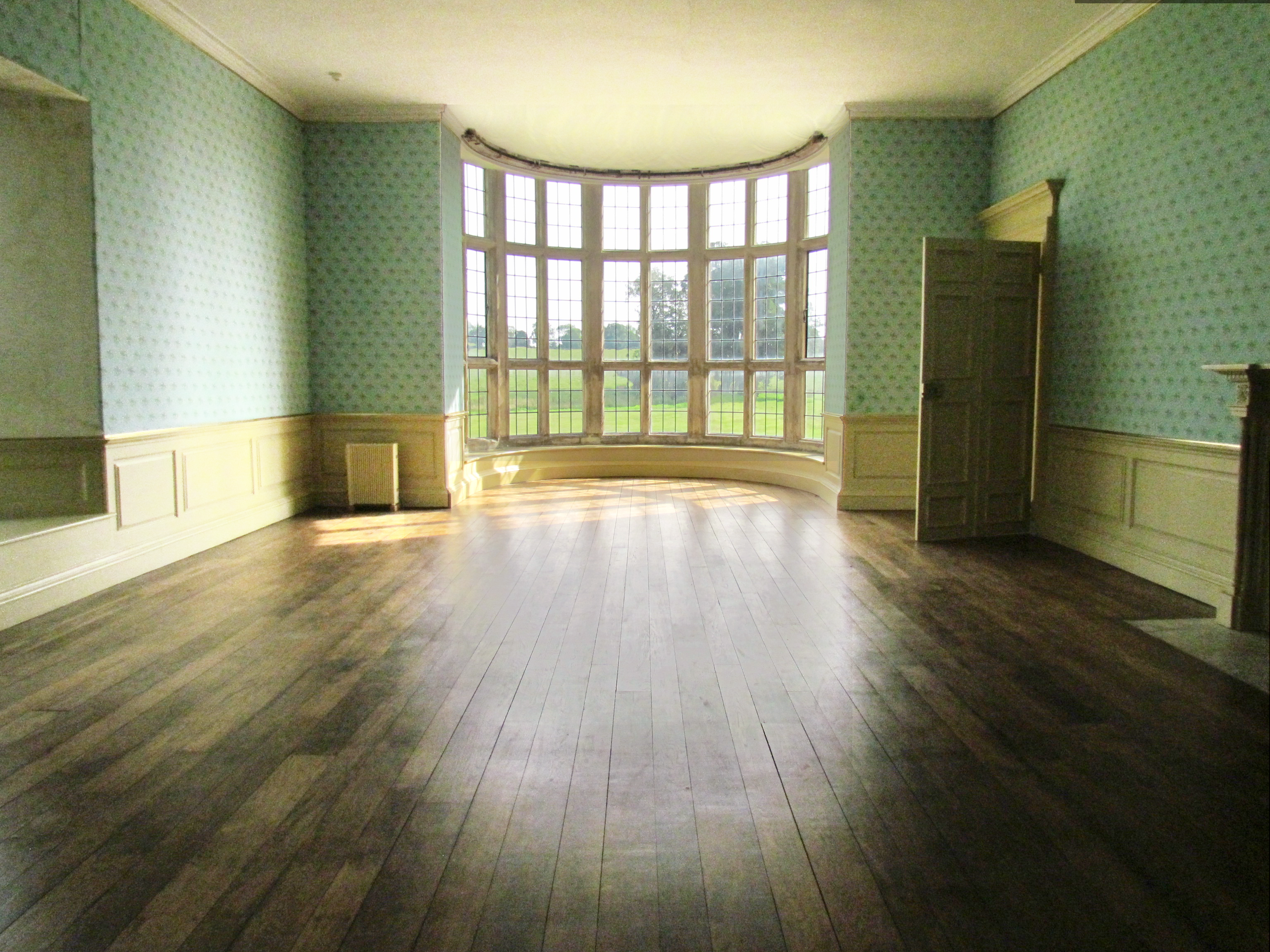
Billiard room

== See also ==
- James Chappell (servant)
