= Kerby, California =

Kerby
- Former settlement
- Location in California
- Coordinates: 39°49′28″N 120°25′19″W
- Country: United States
- State: California
- County: Plumas
- Elevation: 4,895 ft (1,492 m)

Kerby is a former settlement in Plumas County, California, United States. It lay at an elevation of 4895 feet (1492 m).
