= Kirkby (disambiguation) =

Kirkby is a northern English name of Scandinavian origin, meaning "church town". It may refer to:

== Places in the United Kingdom ==
- Kirkby, Merseyside
- Kirkby, North Yorkshire
- Kirkby-in-Ashfield, Nottinghamshire
  - Outwood Academy Kirkby
- Kirkby-in-Furness, Cumbria
- Kirkby la Thorpe, Lincolnshire
- Kirkby on Bain, Lincolnshire
- Kirkby Fleetham, North Yorkshire
- Kirkby Ireleth, Cumbria
- Kirkby Lonsdale, Cumbria
- Kirkby Malham, North Yorkshire
- Kirkby Mallory, Leicestershire
- Kirkby Malzeard, North Yorkshire
- Kirkby Moor, Cumbria
- Kirkby Overblow, North Yorkshire
- Kirkby Stephen, Cumbria
- Kirkby Thore, Cumbria
- East Kirkby, Lincolnshire
- South Kirkby & Moorthorpe, West Yorkshire
- Kirkbymoorside, North Yorkshire

== People ==
- Bruce Kirkby (born 1968), Canadian adventurer
- Elisabeth Kirkby (1921–2026), Australian actress and politician
- Dame Emma Kirkby (born 1949), British soprano singer
- Geoffrey John Kirkby (1918-1998), British Royal Navy officer
- Gordon Kirkby (born 1958), Canadian lawyer and politician
- John Kirkby (died 1290), English ecclesiastic and statesman
- Ollie Kirkby (1886–1964), American actress
- Richard Kirkby (c1625-1681), English politician
- Richard Kirkby (Royal Navy), English captain
- Roger Kirkby (died 1709) (c. 1649–1709), English soldier and politician
- Roger Kirkby (Royalist) (died 1643), English politician
- Sophia Kirkby (born 2001), American luger
- Sydney L. Kirkby (born 1933), Australian surveyor and Antarctic explorer
- Tim Kirkby (born 1970), British film and television director

== Other ==
- Chestermere (Kirkby Field) Airport, Alberta, Canada
- Kirkbi AG v. Ritvik Holdings Inc., a Canadian legal case
- Kirkbie Kendal School, a Business and Enterprise College in Kendal, Cumbria, England

== See also ==
- Kerby
- Kerby (name)
- Kirby
- Kirby (surname)
- Kirkjubæjarklaustur, a place name in Iceland with a parallel etymology and meaning
