= Eric Kirby =

English footballer (1926–2018)

Personal information
- Full name: Eric Kirby
- Date of birth: 19 December 1926
- Place of birth: Sheffield, West Riding of Yorkshire, England
- Date of death: May 2018 (aged 91)
- Height: 5 ft 9 in (1.75 m)
- Position: Half-back

Senior career*
Years	Team	Apps	(Gls)
1949–1952	Sheffield Wednesday	0	(0)
1952–1953	York City	1	(0)
Total		1	(0)
- * Club domestic league appearances and goals

Eric Kirby (12 October 1926 - May 2018) was an English professional footballer who played as a half-back in the Football League for York City, and was on the books of Sheffield Wednesday without making a league appearance.
