= Kirby High School =

Kirby High School may refer to:

- Kirby High School (Arkansas) in Kirby, Arkansas
- Kirby High School (Tennessee) in Memphis, Tennessee
- Kirby High School (1928–1979), Woodville, Texas - funds and land provided by John Henry Kirby
