= Justice Kirby (disambiguation) =

Justice Kirby refers to Michael Kirby (judge) (born 1939), justice of the High Court of Australia. Justice Kirby may also refer to:

- Cam Kirby (1909–2003), justice of the Court of Queen's Bench of Alberta
- David Kirby (judge) (born 1943), justice of the Supreme Court of New South Wales
- Ephraim Kirby (1757–1804), judge of the Superior Court of the Territory of Mississippi
- Holly M. Kirby (born 1957), associate justice of the Tennessee Supreme Court
