= Pauline Kirby =

American military nurse (1905–1981)

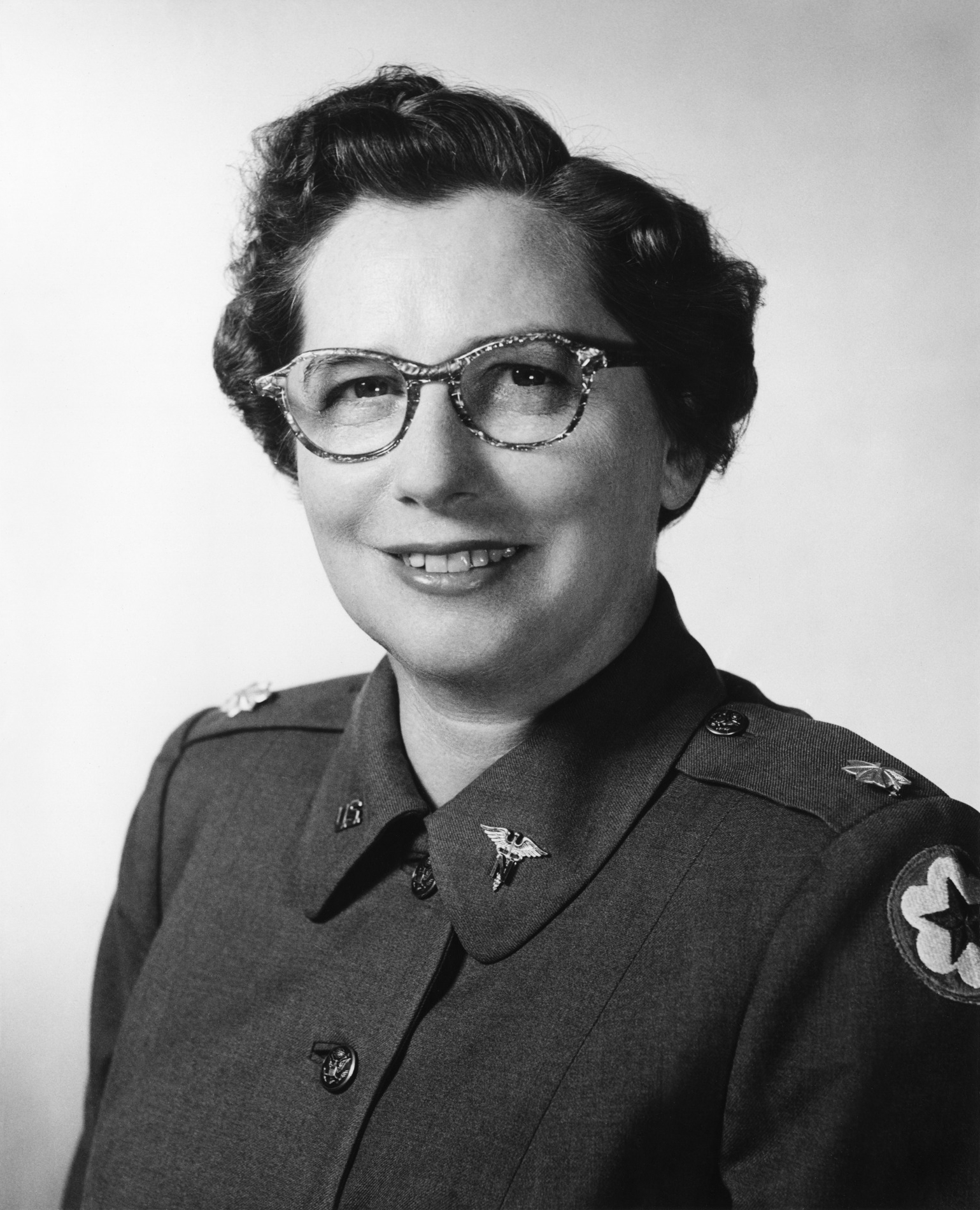
- Official portrait, 1954
- Born: July 9, 1905; Greenwood, Mississippi, U.S.
- Died: November 10, 1981 (aged 76); Greenwood, Mississippi, U.S.
- Alma mater: Baptist Memorial Hospital
- Military career
- Service years: 1927–1957
- Rank: Colonel
- Unit: United States Army Nurse Corps
- Known for: One of the first two Nurse Corps officers to serve in the temporary grade of Colonel
- Other work: Psychiatric nurse

Pauline Kirby (July 9, 1905 – November 10, 1981) was an American nurse and military officer who held several positions throughout her 30 years of service in the United States Army Nurse Corps and the Army of the United States.

== Early life ==
Pauline Kirby was born in Greenwood, Mississippi, on July 9, 1905. Documentation shows that she lived in the city through 1920 with her widowed mother, Cora Kirby, five siblings, a brother in law, and six other housemates. Kirby attended Baptist Memorial Hospital in Memphis, Tennessee and graduated in 1926.

== Service in the United States ==
After entering the United States Army Nurse Corps in 1927, Kirby was assigned to Fort Sam Houston station hospital in Texas. With service number N35, she was appointed second lieutenant of Army Nurse Corps Reserves on June 5, 1927, and began active duty. On June 30, 1928, she transferred to the Army Nurse Corps. She was promoted to first lieutenant of the Army Nurse Corps on February 24, 1941. On May 18, 1943, she took position as major of the Army Nurse Corps. She became lieutenant colonel in the Army of the United States on May 1, 1945. On July 15, 1947, she returned to the Army Nurse Corps with the rank of major. As lieutenant colonels, in 1956, Kirby and Agnes A. Maley were the first two members of the Army Nurse Corps allowed to hold the position as temporary colonels in the Army of the United States. Kirby retired from the Army Nurse Corps on August 31, 1957.

== Nursing positions ==
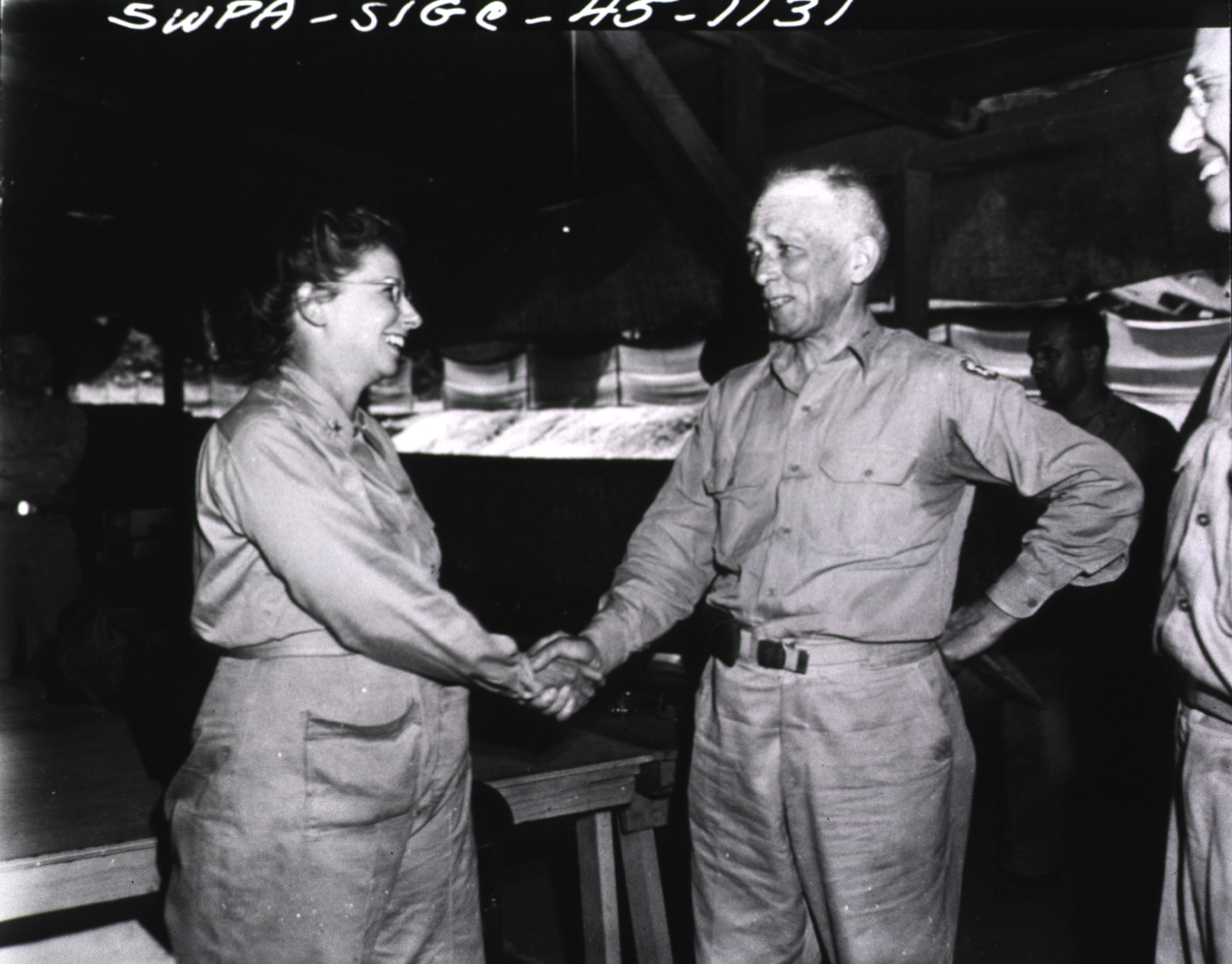
Major Kirby and Major General Norman T. Kirk, surgeon general, in the South West Pacific Area, 1945

From 1942 to 1945, Kirby was the assistant director of nurses in the South West Pacific Area during World War II. After her service during World War II, Kirby was a head nurse at Northington General Hospital in Tuscaloosa, Alabama. A year later, in 1946, she obtained another top nursing position at Moore General Hospital in Asheville, North Carolina. Following this, in 1947, Major Kirby began her work as chief nurse at Percy Jones General Hospital in Battle Creek, Michigan. Kirby continued at this position until 1949 when she replaced Lieutenant Colonel Katherine E. Hayes of the Army Nurse Corps at Tripler Army Hospital in Hawaii. In December 1952, Kirby left Tripler Army Hospital and was titled chief of nursing service at the Army and Navy Hospital in Hot Springs, Arkansas. On May 3, 1954, Kirby maintained her position as chief of nursing service and relocated to Walter Reed Army Medical Center. In 1957, Colonel Kirby was recognized as one of eight army nurses that cared for President Dwight D. Eisenhower while he stayed at the Walter Reed Army Hospital due to inflammation of his small intestine. This complication required surgery, which caused him to receive care from June 7 to 30, 1956.

== Neuropsychiatric work ==
Kirby was assistant director of Nursing in the South West Pacific Area. She developed the foundations of the neuropsychiatric hospitals. In this area, the first two hospitals that were designed to accommodate psychiatric disorders were 141st Station Hospital in Mime Bay and 148th Station Hospital in Oro Bay. These hospitals opened in January 1944. As assistant director, Kirby implemented the following regulations:

1. All nurses within the psychiatric hospitals must partake in a dynamic psychiatric course.
2. All nurses are allowed to be present and give feedback at case conferences for the patients.
3. All nurses must have daily meetings with the ward officers in regard to their patients.

Following the two model hospitals, the 18th, 171st, 233rd, 116th, 124th, 108th, and 364th Station Hospitals began treatment of psychiatric patients. Assistant Director Pauline Kirby reported information on behalf of these hospitals including job descriptions of all positions within the hospitals.

== Death ==
Kirby died in Greenwood, Mississippi, on November 10, 1981.
