= Bill Kerwick =

Irish hurler

Personal information
- Native name: Liam Ó Ciarmhaic (Irish)
- Born: William Kerwick; 30 April 1867 Ballytarsna, County Tipperary, Ireland
- Died: 27 March 1936 (aged 68) Ballytarsna, County Tipperary, Ireland
- Occupation: Farm labourer

Sport
- Sport: Hurling
Club
- Years: Club
- Ballytarsna
Club titles
- Tipperary titles: 1
Inter-county*
Years	County	Apps (scores)
1895	Tipperary	2
Inter-county titles
- Munster titles: 1
- All-Irelands: 1
- *Inter County team apps and scores correct as of 16:50, 10 October 2018.

William Kerwick (30 April 1867 – 27 March 1936) was an Irish sportsperson. He played hurling with his local club Ballytarsna and was a member of the Tipperary senior hurling team in 1895.

== Biography ==
Raised In Ballytarsna, County Tipperary, Kerwick was born to Patrick Kerick, a farm labourer, and his wife Catherine. After a brief education he later worked as a farm labourer.

Kerwick first came to prominence as a hurler with the Ballytarsna club with whom he won a Tipperary Championship medal in 1901.

After impressing at club level, Kerwick joined the Tipperary senior hurling team for just one season during the 1895 championship. He won an All-Ireland Championship medal that year after a defeat of Kilkenny in the final. Kerwick also won a Munster Championship medal that year.

Kerwick died in Cashel on 27 March 1936.

== Honours ==
Ballytarsna

- Tipperary Senior Hurling Championship (1): 1901

Tipperary

- All-Ireland Senior Hurling Championship (1): 1895
- Munster Senior Hurling Championship (1): 1895
