= McKleroy-Wilson-Kirby House =

- U.S. National Register of Historic Places
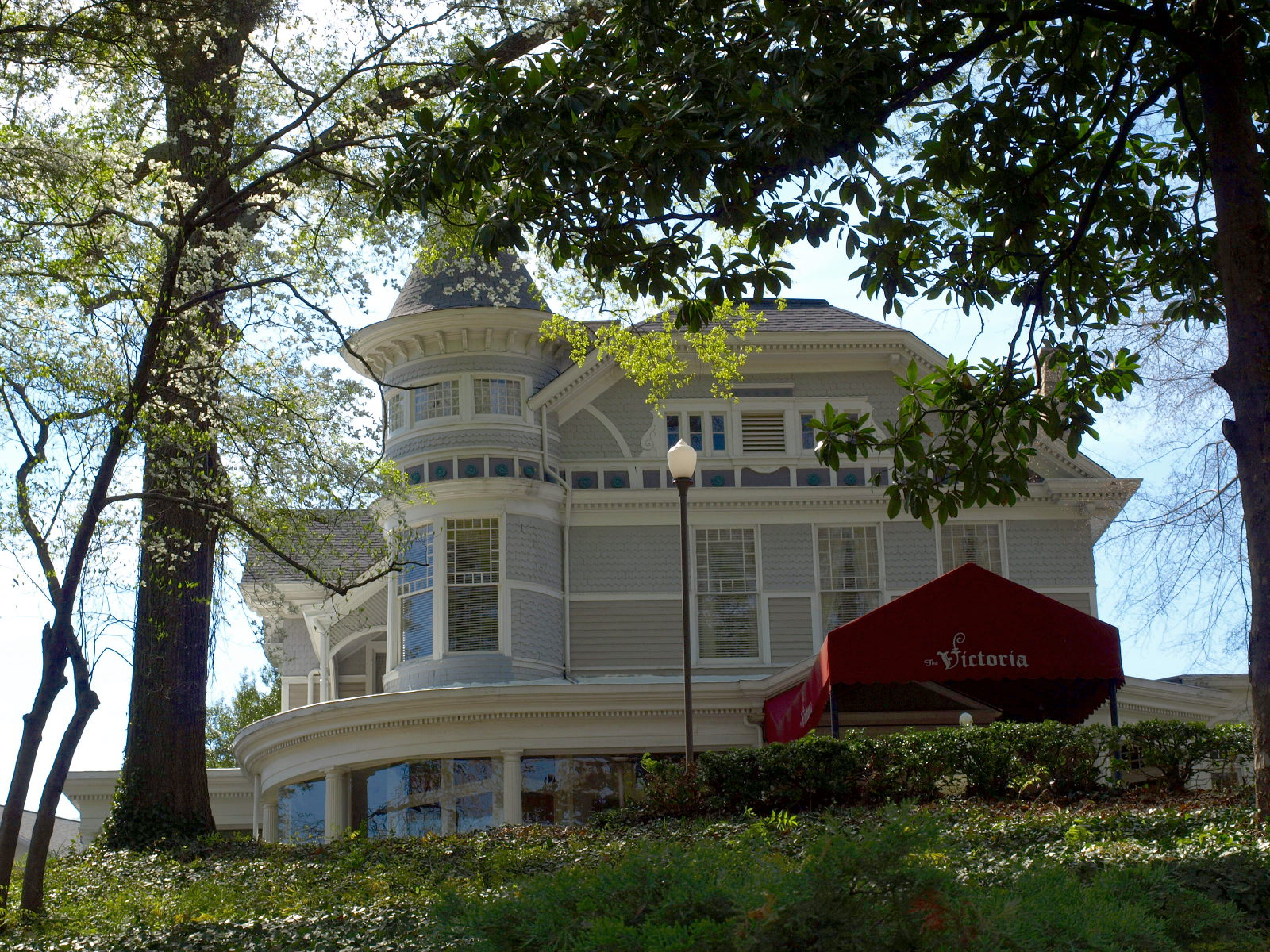

- Location within Alabama
- Location: 1604 Quintard Ave., Anniston, Alabama
- Coordinates: 33°39′55″N 85°49′39″W
- Area: 2.5 acres (1.0 ha)
- Built: 1888
- Architect: Moser, John
- Architectural style: Queen Anne
- NRHP reference No.: 84000597
- Added to NRHP: August 30, 1984

The McKleroy-Wilson-Kirby House, at 1604 Quintard Avenue in Anniston, Alabama, United States, is a Queen Anne-style house built in 1888. It was listed on the National Register of Historic Places in 1984.

It is attributed "by tradition" to architect John Moser.

The house was deemed "architecturally significant as the last remaining mansion on Anniston's premier 19th century boulevard – Quintard Avenue" and as a good example of Queen Anne architecture.

It was also deemed "significant for its associations with John Martin McKleroy and his son, William Henry, both of whom occupied the house. The elder McKleroy was associated with a number of the major industrial concerns in the city and prior to moving to Anniston in the 1880s, was a powerful politician - serving as chairman of the State Democratic Executive Committee in 1886. His son served as mayor of the city and was president of both the Anniston National Bank and the Oxford National Bank."

The property includes its carriage house and a guest house.
