= Maxwell-Kirby House =

Historic house in Tennessee, United States

- Maxwell--Kirby House
- U.S. National Register of Historic Places
- Location: 8671 Northshore Dr; Knoxville, Tennessee
- Coordinates: 35.8852°N 84.0399°W
- Built: 1830
- Architectural style: Colonial Revival
- MPS: Knoxville and Knox County MPS
- NRHP reference No.: 99001446
- Added to NRHP: November 30, 1999

The Maxwell-Kirby House is a historic home located at 8671 Northshore Drive in Knoxville, Tennessee. it is also known as William Maxwell House. It was designed in the Colonial Revival style, and is on the National Register of Historic Places. It is currently a private residence.

The Robert Maxwell House sits on a rise, facing southeast, at the end of a long gravel drive that travels north and west from Northshore Drive, about ten miles (16 km) from downtown Knoxville, in Knox County, Tennessee. The house is in a cleared and landscaped yard, surrounding by rolling terrain that is heavily forested. An original log barn, in extreme disrepair, is located southwest of the house and is not included in this nomination due to its dilapidation. Included in the nomination is a pump house located to the southeast of the house. The yard consists of approximately 13 acres (53,000 m^{2}). The front yard was originally landscaped and may have been tiered. Marble walkways, walls and benches are being found as the present owners have time to clear the undergrowth.

Lowe's Ferry Road, now abandoned in this section, originally traveled in front of the house on its way south to the Tennessee River. Lowe's Ferry then proceeded to the south side of the river, in Blount County. The road was heavily traveled, both in Knox County on the north side of the Tennessee River and in Blount County on the south bank. However, when bridges caused the ferry to be abandoned and rail and later automobile transportation caused traffic to proceed in an east–west rather than north–south direction, this section of Lowe's Ferry Road was abandoned. These changes occurred at the end of the 19th century. Springs on the property are known as the Maxwell Springs, and have been extensively used for many years, both by Indian travelers prior to European settlement, and by later travelers in the period of early settlement in Knox County.

The original part of the Robert Maxwell House is constructed with heavy timber framing, and its original construction date is unknown but assumed to be c. 1830, since heavy timber-frame construction was common in Knox County at that time. The house was extensively remodeled in 1886 by a descendant of the original owners, and was substantially altered at that time. Its effective construction dates from 1886. The house now consists of three bays with a gable end roof, and is two stories in height. The rear section of the house was added in the 1886 remodeling, and is of frame construction. The house is covered with weatherboard wall covering. The house has a cross gable roof covered with v-crimp metal roof covering.

On the primary (east) facade is a full-length porch with four wood columns in the Doric order. A six panel cross and Bible front door is flanked by pilasters and topped with a cornice. Gable ends feature plain fascia boards with sawn wood attic vents. A front porch supported by stone piers was added c. 1920. An exterior end stone chimney is located on the west gable end, and was also probably added c. 1920. In the basement, which was dug in 1886, can be seen the remnants of a brick fireplace foundation. The windows are six over six double hung wood windows, with the upper windows on the rear addition being six over six wood casement windows. A side porch is located on the south elevation, with two round wood columns with Doric capitals.

The interior of the original front section of the house retains a c. 1830 Georgian style mantel and original door and wood trim. The floors throughout the house are made of oak and typical of the 1880s, and were probably added with the 1886 remodeling. Doors throughout the original section of the interior are panel and frame doors with four panels. Casement windows were added to the rear addition in the 1920s, as were French doors. The dining room in the rear addition features a bay window with beaded wood trim, and three six over six windows. Walls throughout the home are plaster and lathe.

The pump house located on the property is wood frame, and features a reversible sand filter. Four over four wood windows are now boarded over but still present. The pump house has a concrete floor that was probably added c. 1920. It is of frame construction with weatherboard siding and a gable roof with asphalt shingle roof covering. It is entered through a panel and frame door with four panels.

The property where the Robert Maxwell House is located was originally settled by William Newton Maxwell's father-in-law, (Mahala Scott's father) who built the home around 1830. The exact date of settlement is not known. Springs on the property are called the Maxwell Springs, and it is known that Maxwell lived there when his son Robert Maxwell was born in 1847. The heavy timber-frame house that forms the basis of the present house was substantial, and it is assumed that Maxwell was a prosperous farmer in the area. That portion of the house was probably built in the 1830s, when heavy timber-frame construction was common in Knox County. Evidence of brick fireplaces and piers exists under the oldest portion of the house in the crawl space. Evidence has also been found to suggest that the heavy timber-frame construction supplanted an even earlier structure in the same location. However, no record has been found to suggest who owned the property at that time, or what either the heavy timber frame or the earlier structures looked like. In the 1870 census, when his son Robert was 23, William Maxwell was still noted as head of the household.

Robert Maxwell, William Maxwell's son, was born in 1847. In the 1880s he inherited the house from his father. At that time, three hundred acres surrounding the present 13-acre (53,000 m^{2}) tract were subdivided and some of the land was sold. James Maxwell made extensive changes in the structure and lived there until his death, when the house was sold to Matt Kirby. Kirby evidently made changes to the house when he bought it, and lived there for a time. Kirby was a farmer who operated a dairy farm in this area and soon rented the house to a succession of families. The only family name that survives as a renter from that time is that of Dempster.

In 1966, the Robert Maxwell House was sold by Matt Kirby to Jack Stroud. Jack Stroud and his widow Hazel lived in the house for approximately twenty years before selling it to the present owners. The present owners have done extensive remodeling and restoration work, retaining the 1920s changes made to the house and preserving the extensive additions and remodeling completed in 1886.

The Robert Maxwell House, with its Georgian Revival styling and setting, is significant for its architecture. As urban development proceeds rapidly in west Knox County, few houses from the 19th century are allowed to remain. The Robert Maxwell House is the most unaltered of the two or three known to remain on Northshore Drive, and is one of very few in the western part of the county. With its historical associations and setting, and its significant nineteenth-century architectural features, the Robert Maxwell House provides an increasingly rare glimpse into pre twentieth century residential architecture in this section of Knox County.
