= Kirby Cone =

The Kirby Cone (85°54′S 136°26′W) is a distinctive sharp peak on the spur which extends north from the northwest end of Michigan Plateau, Antarctica. It lies near where the Reedy Glacier and the Kansas Glaciers meet, along the southern edge of the latter. It was mapped by the United States Geological Survey from ground surveys and U.S. Navy air photos, 1960–63, and was named by the Advisory Committee on Antarctic Names for Charles H. Kirby, a radioman at Byrd Station, winter 1961.
