= William R. Kirby Sr. House =

Historic house in Michigan, United States

- U.S. National Register of Historic Places
- Michigan State Historic Site
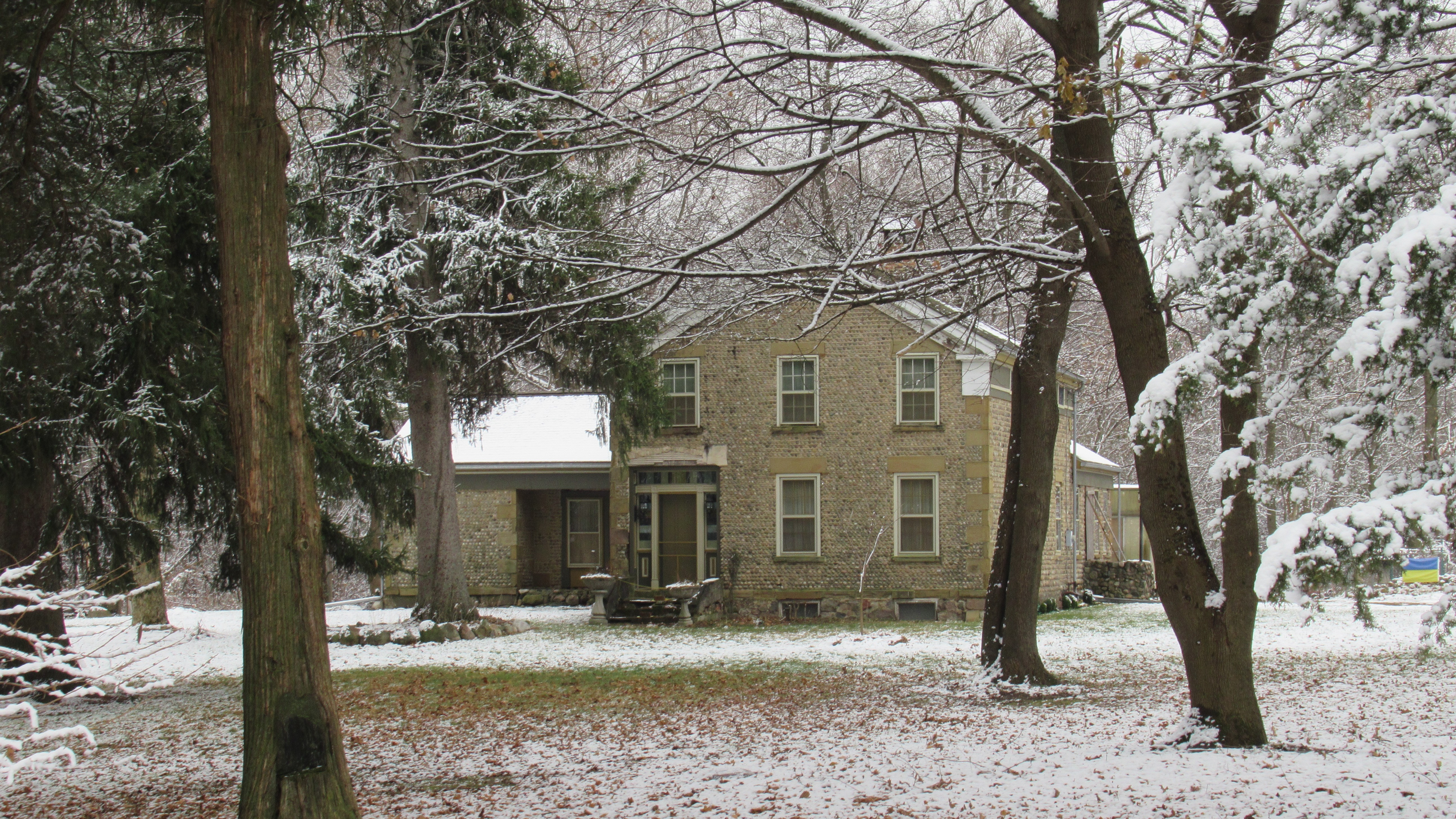

- Location within Michigan Location within the United States
- Interactive map
- Location: 3771 State Road; Adams Township
- Nearest city: Hillsdale, Michigan
- Coordinates: 41°55′36″N 84°34′41″W
- Area: 3 acres (1.2 ha)
- Built: 1845
- Architectural style: Greek Revival
- NRHP reference No.: 82002836

Significant dates
- Added to NRHP: July 20, 1982
- Designated MSHS: June 15, 1979

The William R. Kirby Sr. House (also known as the Kirby–Keefer House) is a private house located at 377 State Road in Hillsdale, Michigan. It was designated a Michigan State Historic Site in 1979 and listed on the National Register of Historic Places in 1982. It is one of the few early cobblestone houses extant in Michigan.

== History ==
William Kirby Sr. was born near Leeds, England in 1805. He married Hannah Sykes, and the couple emigrated to the United States in 1827. After living in New York and Ohio, in 1835 they moved to Hillsdale County to homestead, one of the first families to settle in the area. In the 1840s, William and Hannah constructed this house. It took three years to gather the cobbles used in construction. Hannah Kirby died in 1876 and William in 1888, by which time their homestead had grown to 240 acres. The house was eventually passed on to William Kirby Jr.

The house was later owned by Robert Keefer.

== Description ==
The Kirby House is a two-story Greek Revival with a gable roof and single story additions on the side and rear. The house is constructed of fieldstone faced with parallel rows of cobblestones, with cut sandstone quoins, lintels, and sills.

== Images ==
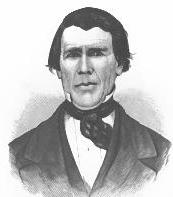
William Kirby, Sr.

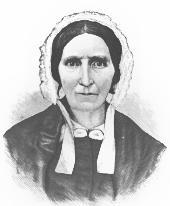
Hannah Kirby

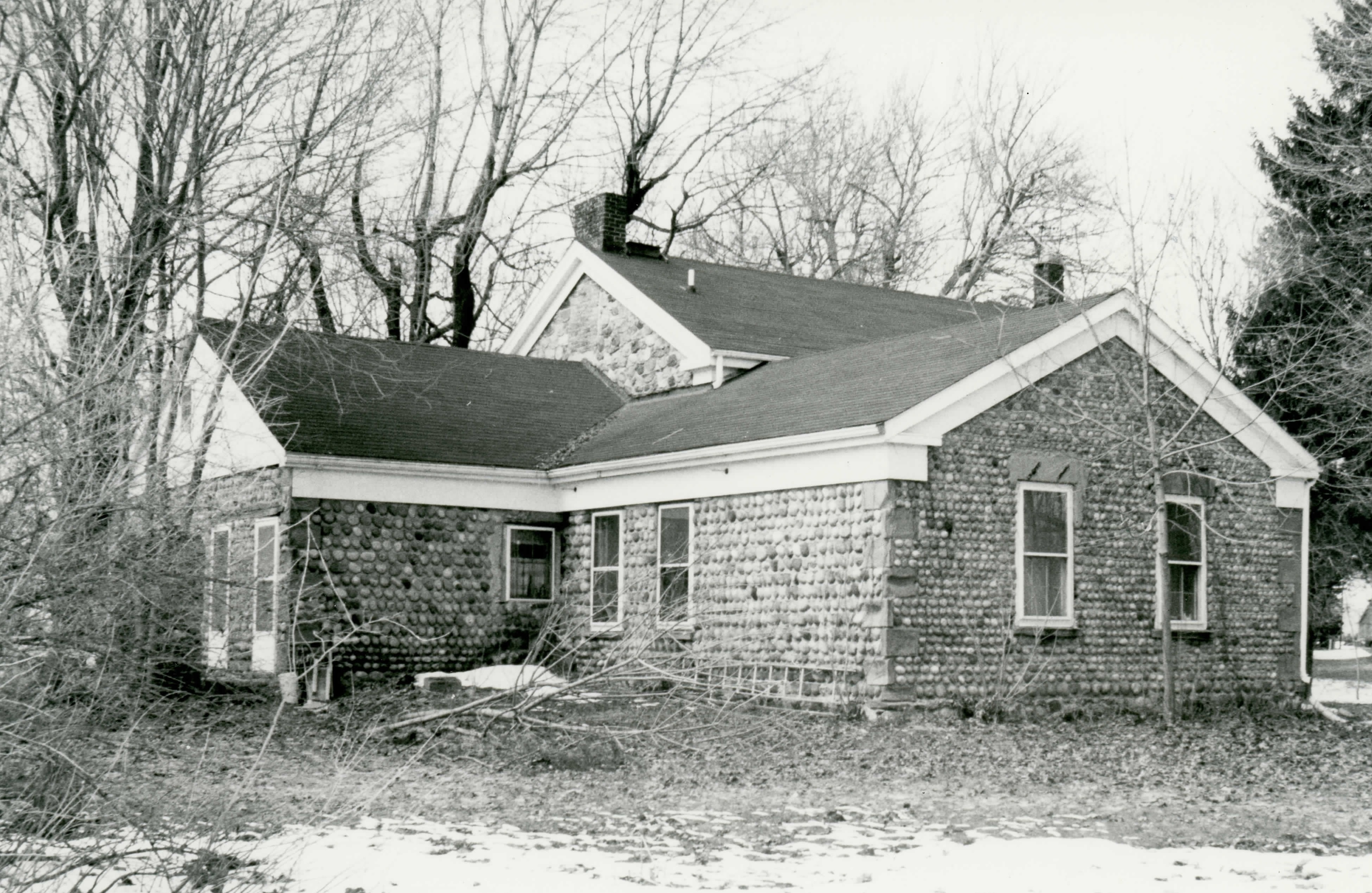
Historic image from 1982
