= Tom Kerwick =

Irish hurler (1885–1929)

Personal information
- Native name: Tomás Ó Ciarmhaic (Irish)
- Born: 27 June 1885 Thurles, County Tipperary, Ireland
- Died: 9 February 1929 (aged 43) Westport, County Mayo, Ireland
- Occupation: Carpenter

Sport
- Sport: Hurling
Club
- Years: Club
- Thurles Sarsfield's
Club titles
- Tipperary titles: 6
Inter-county
- Years: County
- 1906-1912: Tipperary
Inter-county titles
- Munster titles: 3
- All-Irelands: 2

Thomas P. Kerwick (27 June 1885 – 9 February 1929) was an Irish hurler who played for the Tipperary senior team between 1906 and 1912.

== Biography ==
Kerwick joined the team during the 1906 championship and was a regular member of the starting fifteen until his retirement after the 1912 championship. During that time he won two All-Ireland medals and three Munster medals.

At club level Kerwick won numerous county championship medals with Thurles Sarsfields.

== Honours ==
Thurles Sarsfields

- Tipperary Senior Hurling Championship (6): 1904, 1906, 1907, 1908, 1909, 1911

Tipperary

- All-Ireland Senior Hurling Championship (2): 1906, 1908
- Munster Senior Hurling Championship (3): 1906, 1908, 1909
