= Henry Kirby =

English cricketer

Personal information
- Full name: Henry Richard Kirby
- Born: 18 March 1889; Patrixbourne, Kent, England
- Died: 20 July 1976 (aged 87); Mayfield, Sussex, England
- Batting: Unknown

Domestic team information
- Years: Team
- 1911: Sussex

Career statistics
Competition	First-class
Matches	1
Runs scored	9
Batting average	4.50
100s/50s	–/–
Top score	7
Balls bowled	–
Wickets	–
Bowling average	–
5 wickets in innings	–
10 wickets in match	–
Best bowling	–
Catches/stumpings	–/–
- Source: Cricinfo, 30 June 2012

Henry Richard Kirby (19 March 1889 – 20 July 1976) was an English cricketer. Kirby's batting style is unknown. He was born at Patrixbourne, Kent, and was educated at Malvern College.

Kirby made a single first-class appearance for Sussex against Cambridge at Fenner's in 1911. Sussex won the toss and elected to bat, making 405 all out, with Kirby scoring 7 runs before he was dismissed by Norman Holloway. Cambridge University responded in their first-innings by making 247 all out. Forced to follow-on in their second-innings, Cambridge University made 437 all out, setting Sussex 280 for victory. However, in their second-innings chase, Sussex were dismissed for 238, with Kirby being dismissed for 2 runs by Alexander Cowie. Cambridge University won the match by 41 runs. This was his only major appearance for Sussex.

He died at Mayfield, Sussex, on 20 July 1976.
