= Alex Kirby (journalist) =

British journalist (1939–2025)

Bernard William Alexander Kirby (11 July 1939 – 23 November 2025) was a British journalist, who specialised in environmental issues. He worked in various capacities at the British Broadcasting Corporation (BBC) for nearly 20 years. From 1987 to 1996, he was the agricultural and environmental correspondent for BBC News, in radio and television. He moved to religious affairs in 1996, and left the BBC in 1998 to work as a freelance journalist. He also provides media skills training to companies, universities and NGOs. He is also currently the environmental correspondent for BBC News Online, and hosted BBC Radio 4's environment series, Costing the Earth. He also writes for The Guardian and Climate News Network. He has no formal scientific training. He wrote a regular column for BBC Wildlife magazine. Kirby died from cancer in Lewes, on 23 November 2025, at the age of 86.
