= Stephen Kirby =

- Education: University of Virginia (PhD)
- Occupation: Author
- Known for: Criticism of Islam
- Political party: Republican

Stephen M. Kirby is an American author, critic of Islam and retired Los Angeles police detective, who has later been the chair of the Republican Party of Warren County, Iowa.

== Biography ==
In his career, Kirby spent over 31 years in law enforcement, mostly with the Los Angeles Police Department (LAPD), the latter half of which was spent specializing in white collar crimes and public corruption. He received a Ph.D. in foreign affairs from the University of Virginia in 1993.

His 2010 book Islam and Barack Hussein Obama: A Handbook on Islam criticized Barack Obama, indicting the president for pro-Islamic addresses, including the 2009 "A New Beginning" speech in Cairo, Egypt.

Kirby, while later living in the Des Moines, Iowa area, has held presentations about Islam and spoken at seminars on radical Islam and Sharia law, which has been protested against by the Council on American-Islamic Relations (CAIR). In 2017, Kirby wrote against the move of a group called the American Muslim Alliance to Des Moines, which sparked a number of emails between Iowa legislators. Democratic Rep. Art Staed described Kirby's views as "extremist propaganda from a bigoted man with Islamophobia," while Republican Senator Jason Schultz emailed Kirby to thank him, describing him as a scholar who understands the Quran. Kirby responded to the criticism that it came from people who had never heard him speak, and that he only quoted passages from the teachings of Muhammad. He also noted that he was the only non-Muslim to have had a table during the annual Muslim Day event at the Iowa Capitol the previous year.

Kirby's 2017 book The Lure of Fantasy Islam: Exposing the Myths and Myth Makers was praised by Beila Rabinowitz, director of the Militant Islam Monitor, who said it "provides the intellectual arsenal to refute the Muslim and non-Muslim ‘Myths and Myth Makers’ and should be required reading for anyone who wants to further their understanding of what ‘The Religion of Peace’ is really about." Conversely, Zahid Mian of the Muslims Writers Guild of America called Kirby "a noted bigot whose mission is only to spread hatred of Muslims."

His book Islamic Doctrine versus The U.S. Constitution: The Dilemma for Muslim Public Officials, published in 2019, was released by the Center for Security Policy as part of its "counterjihad campaign". He has also contributed to websites such as Jihad Watch, FrontPage Magazine and American Thinker.

Kirby has later been the chair of the Warren County Republican Party, and in 2021 advocated for ending Indianola's use of equity challenge, where Kirby lived, claiming anti-white bias.

== Bibliography ==
- Islam and Barack Hussein Obama: A Handbook on Islam. 2010. ISBN 9781453682630.
- Letting Islam Be Islam: Separating Truth From Myth. 2012. ISBN 9781478118299.
- Islam According to Muhammad, Not Your Neighbor. 2014. ISBN 9781499691689.
- Islam's Militant Prophet: Muhammad and Forced Conversions to Islam. 2016. ISBN 9781536892383.
- The Lure of Fantasy Islam: Exposing the Myths and Myth Makers. 2017. ISBN 9781546316978.
- Islamic Doctrine versus the U.S. Constitution: The Dilemma for Muslim Public Officials. 2019. ISBN 9781709741067.
