= Frank Howard Kirby =

Recipient of the Victoria Cross

Frank Howard Kirby VC CBE DCM
- Born: 12 November 1871; Thame, Oxfordshire
- Died: 8 July 1956 (aged 84); Sidcup, Kent
- Burial place: Streatham Park Cemetery
- Military career
- Allegiance: United Kingdom
- Branch: British Army (1892–1918); Royal Air Force (1918–1926)
- Service years: 1892–1926
- Rank: Group captain
- Units: Royal Engineers; Royal Flying Corps
- Conflicts: Second Boer War; World War I
- Awards: Victoria Cross; Commander of the Order of the British Empire; Distinguished Conduct Medal; Mentioned in dispatches

Group Captain Frank Howard Kirby, VC, CBE, DCM (12 November 1871 – 8 July 1956) was a British military officer and a recipient of the Victoria Cross, the highest award for gallantry in the face of the enemy that can be awarded to British and Commonwealth forces.

== Military career ==
=== British Army ===
Kirby was 28 years old, and a corporal in the Corps of Royal Engineers, British Army during the Second Boer War when the following deed took place for which he was awarded the VC:

On the morning of the 2nd June, 1900, a party sent to try to cut the Delagoa Bay Railway were retiring, hotly pressed by very superior numbers. During one of the successive retirements of the rearguard, a man, whose horse had been shot, was seen running after his comrades. He was a long way behind the rest of his troop and was under a brisk fire. From among the retiring troop Corporal Kirby turned and rode back to the man's assistance. Although by the time he reached him they were under a heavy fire at close range, Corporal Kirby managed to get the dismounted man up behind him and to take him clear off over the next rise held by our rearguard. This is the third occasion on which Corporal Kirby has displayed gallantry in the face of the enemy.

The award was presented to him by the Duke of York (later King George V) in Cape Town in August 1901, during the visit of the Prince and his wife to that city as part of their British Empire tour. Kirby also received the Distinguished Conduct Medal (DCM) for his service in South Africa. The medal was presented to him in March 1902 after his return to the United Kingdom, in the presence of one thousand Royal Engineers on parade.

Kirby was appointed a regimental sergeant major at Chatham in 1906. Five years later, in April 1911, he was gazetted with an honorary commission as a lieutenant, appointed a quartermaster, and posted to the newly formed Air Battalion of the Royal Engineers. He attended the first course at the Central Flying School in 1912.

=== From the Flying Corps to the Air Force ===
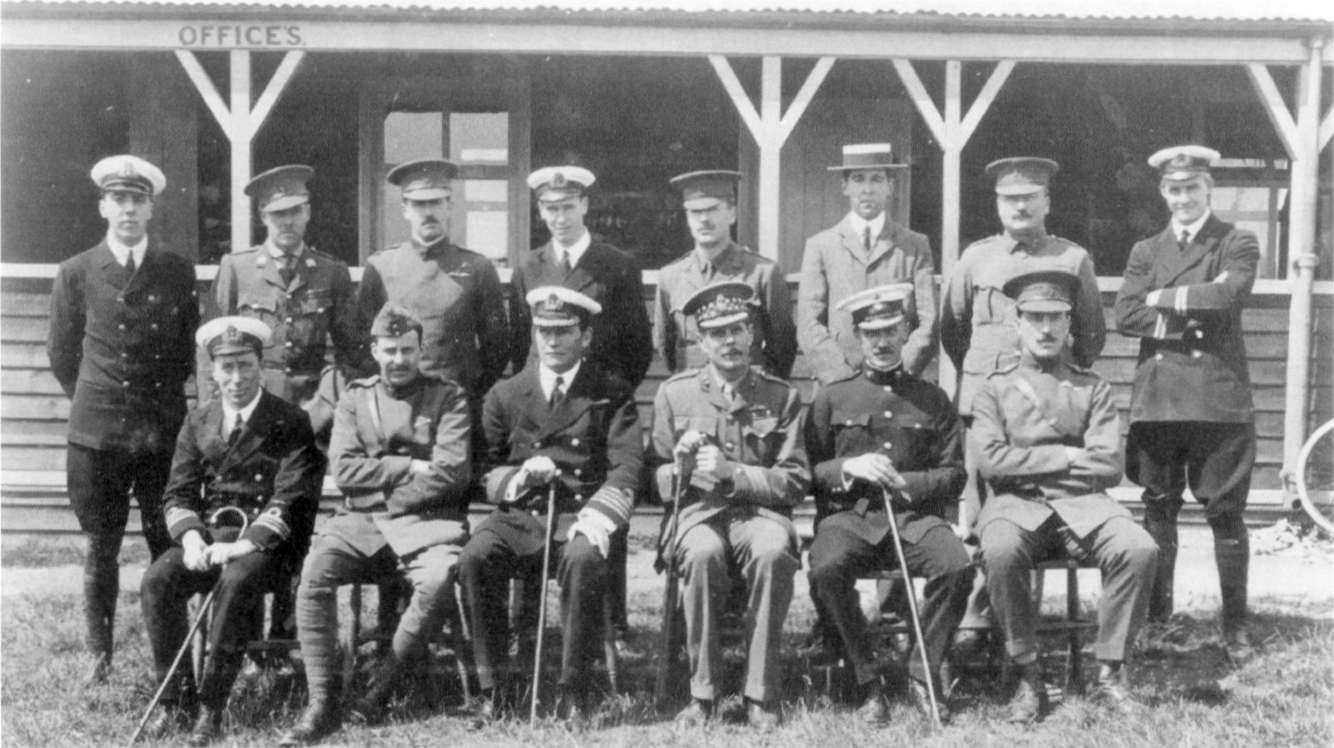
Kirby standing one place in from the right at the Central Flying School in 1913

Kirby subsequently transferred to the Royal Flying Corps (which had absorbed the Air Battalion) and he was commissioned as an Equipment Officer. Kirby was appointed the Stores Officer at the Central Flying School. Kirby served at No 1 Aircraft Depot at Saint-Omer in early 1916, and with No 3 Army Aircraft Park in July 1916. In December 1916 he became commanding officer of No 1 Stores Depot at Kidbrooke in south London.

Kirby went on to achieve the rank of lieutenant colonel. Kirby remained in the Royal Air Force after the end of the First World War and was granted a permanent commission as a wing commander in 1920. Kirby was appointed a Commander of the Order of the British Empire (CBE) in the 1926 Birthday Honours. He eventually retired, with permission to retain the rank of group captain, in December 1926.

Kirby's Victoria Cross is on display at the Lord Ashcroft VC Gallery in the Imperial War Museum in London. He is buried in Streatham Park Cemetery.

There is an Oxfordshire Blue Plaque on Wavertree, 18 Lower High Street, Thame, the house where he was born. He is also included in the First World War archive of Alleyn's School in Dulwich where Kirby was a pupil from 1882 to 1884

== Bibliography ==
- Ingleton, Roy (2011). Kent VCs. Pen and Sword Books. ISBN 978-1848844094.
