= Fermor =

Fermor is a surname which is most present in England and France more specifically Normandy. It originated from Old French and most likely meant Farmer. A notable Fermor family is located in Crowborough, East Sussex where Sir Henry Fermor funded the first chapel (All Saints) and an Anglican school which is still in use today (Sir Henry Fermor Anglican School).

Notable people with the surname include:

- George Fermor (died 1612), English soldier and landowner
- Henrietta Louisa Fermor (1698–1761), English letter writer
- Lewis Leigh Fermor (1880–1954), British geologist, father of Patrick
- Patrick Leigh Fermor (1915–2011), British author, scholar and soldier
- Richard Fermor (d. 1551), English wool merchant and landowner
- Thomas Fermor (by 1523–1580), English politician
- Agnes Fermor, English Catholic, suspected involvement in Gunpowder Plot
- Lady Juliana Fermor Penn, correspondent of U.S. President John Adams
- Lady Charlotte Fermor, British royal governess
- William Fermor, 1st Baron Leominster, English politician and peer
- Thomas Fermor, 1st Earl of Pomfret, English peer and courtier
- George Fermor, 2nd Earl of Pomfret, British army officer and Gentleman of the Bedchamber
- George Fermor, 3rd Earl of Pomfret, British peer, lived at Easton Neston house
- Thomas Fermor, 4th Earl of Pomfret (1770–1833), British army officer
- George Richard William Fermor, 5th Earl of Pomfret, last earl, baron, and baronet of his branch
- William Fermor (1702–1771), Russian army officer, commander at Zorndorf

== See also ==
- Farmer (surname)
- Fermor-Hesketh, surname
