= George Fermor =

George Fermor may refer to:

- Sir George Fermor (died 1612), English soldier and landowner
- George Fermor, 2nd Earl of Pomfret (1722–1785), British Army officer
- George Fermor, 3rd Earl of Pomfret (1768–1830)
- George Richard William Fermor, 5th Earl of Pomfret (1824–1867)
