= William Fermor (disambiguation) =

William Fermor was an Imperial Russian Army officer.

William Fermor is also the name of:

- William Fermor (died 1552) (by 1480–1552), MP for Oxfordshire 1539
- Sir William Fermor, 1st Baronet (1619–1661) royalist
- William Fermor, 1st Baron Leominster (1648–1711), MP for Northampton
