= Henry O'Brien, Lord Ibrackan =

Irish nobleman and politician

Member of the Irish Parliament for County Clare
- In office 1661–1666
- In office 1670–1678

Personal details
- Born: c.1642
- Died: 1 September 1678
- Spouse(s): Katherine Stuart, 7th Baroness Clifton
- Children: 6
- Parents: Henry O'Brien, 7th Earl of Thomond (father); Anne O'Brien (mother)

Henry O'Brien, Lord Ibrackan, or Lord O'Brien (c. 1642 – 1 September 1678), styled Hon. Henry O'Brien until 1657, was an Irish nobleman and politician. He was the son of Henry O'Brien, 7th Earl of Thomond, and his first wife, and cousin, Anne O'Brien.

He married Katherine Stuart, 7th Baroness Clifton, daughter of George Stuart, 9th Seigneur d'Aubigny and Lady Katherine Howard: the Aubigny Stuarts were a junior branch of the reigning House of Stuart. They had six children (of whom three died young):

- Donough O'Brien, Lord Ibrackan (1663–1682), lost in the sinking of HMS Gloucester
- Hon. Henry O'Brien (b. & d. 1665)
- Hon. Charles O'Brien (b. & d. 1666)
- Hon. George O'Brien, died young
- Hon. Mary O'Brien (d. 1683), married John FitzGerald, 18th Earl of Kildare
- Katherine Hyde, 8th Baroness Clifton (d. 1706), married Edward Hyde, 3rd Earl of Clarendon

In 1661, he represented County Clare in the Parliament of Ireland, and from 1670 until his death in 1678, Northampton. In 1673, he was appointed to the Privy Council of Ireland. His wife's relationship with Charles II gave them a valuable opening at Court, where they already had a friend in Sir Joseph Williamson and they enjoyed high favour in the 1660s.

He died of disease while in camp with his regiment in Flanders. His courtesy title passed to his younger half-brother Henry Horatio O'Brien, Lord Ibrackan. Katherine within three months married their old friend, the statesman Sir Joseph Williamson. The speed of her remarriage gave rise to unkind rumours that the pair had been lovers, and the marriage was disapproved of, even by her children, since Williamson, the son of a country vicar, was not considered a suitable match for a connection of the King.

He is a major character in The Piccadilly Plot, the seventh in the Thomas Chaloner mystery novels by Susanna Gregory.

Parliament of England
Preceded by Hon. Christopher Hatton; Sir Henry Yelverton	Member of Parliament for Northampton; 1670–1678; With: Sir William Fermor	Succeeded by Sir William Fermor; Hon. Ralph Montagu
