= Earl of Pomfret =

Earldom in the Peerage of Great Britain

Earldom of Pomfret
- Arms of Fermor
- Creation date: 27 December 1721
- Created by: George I
- Peerage: Peerage of Great Britain
- First holder: Thomas Fermor, 2nd Baron Leominster
- Last holder: George Fermor, 5th Earl of Pomfret
- Remainder to: 1st Earl's heirs male of the body lawfully begotten
- Subsidiary titles: Baron Leominster
- Status: Extinct
- Extinction date: 8 June 1867
- Seat: Easton Neston
- Motto: Hora e Sempre (Latin for 'Now and Always')

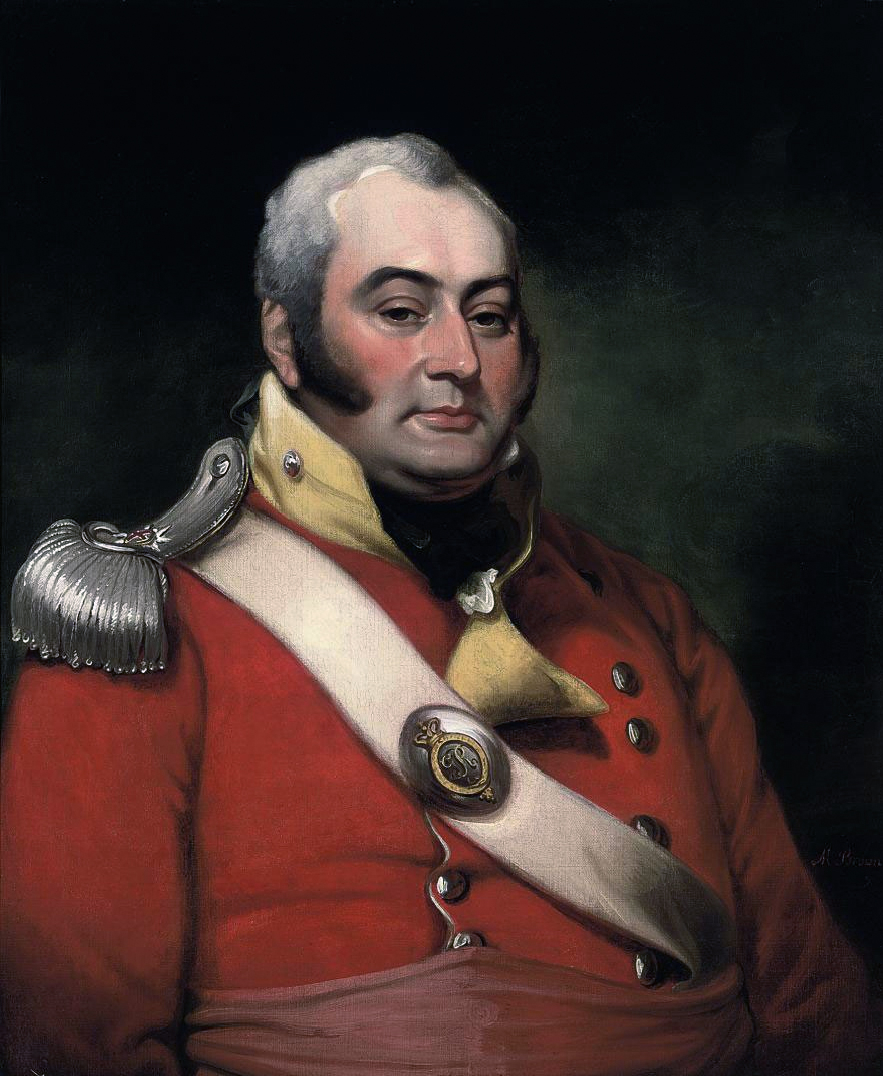
George Fermor, 3rd Earl of Pomfret

Earl of Pomfret (alias Pontefract) (Note: See Pontefract, with the territorial designation, in the County of York.) was a title in the Peerage of Great Britain created in 1721 for Thomas Fermor, 2nd Baron Leominster. The title became extinct upon the death of the fifth earl in 1867.

== Ancestral titles and achievements ==
The Fermor family descended from Richard Fermor (d. 1552), who acquired great wealth as a wool merchant. However, he fell out with Henry VIII after remaining an adherent of Catholicism and had his estates confiscated. Some of the estates, including Easton Neston in South Northamptonshire, were restored after the accession of Edward VI.

In 1603, his grandson Sir George Fermor entertained James I and Anne of Denmark at Easton Neston. In 1615, he was confirmed by the Crown following his marriage as lord of the manor of Westoning, Bedfordshire.

Sir George's grandson William Fermor was created a Baronet, of Easton Neston in the County of Northampton, in the Baronetage of England in 1641, aged nineteen and succeeded by his son. The latter was raised in 1692 to the Peerage of England as Baron Leominster (Note: Also in official documents recorded as Baron Lempster.), in the County of Hereford. His eldest son was elevated to become Earl of Pomfret in 1721. The latter was succeeded by his son, who became a Gentleman of the Bedchamber to George III and sold the manor of Westoning in 1767 to John Everitt. Two sons, the third and fourth Earls, succeeded. The titles became extinct upon the death of the fourth Earl's son in 1867.

The seat of the Fermor family was Easton Neston in Northamptonshire. The house came into the Hesketh family (who were later created Barons Hesketh) through the marriage in 1846 of Sir Thomas George Hesketh, 5th Baronet, of Rufford, to Lady Anna Maria Arabella Fermor, sister and heiress of the 5th Earl of Pomfret. The main blocks and much of the gothick village of Hulcote were sold by the 3rd Baron Hesketh in 2005 to Leon Max.

== Fermor Baronets, of Easton Neston (1641) ==
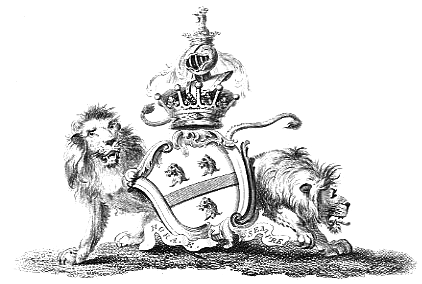
Arms of Fermor

- Sir William Fermor, 1st Baronet (1619–1661)
- Sir William Fermor, 2nd Baronet (1648–1711) (created Baron Leominster in 1692)

== Barons Leominster (1692) ==
- William Fermor, 1st Baron Leominster (1648–1711)
- Thomas Fermor, 2nd Baron Leominster (1698–1753) (created Earl of Pomfret in 1721)

== Earls of Pomfret (1721) ==
- Thomas Fermor, 1st Earl of Pomfret (1698–1753)
- George Fermor, 2nd Earl of Pomfret (1722–1785)
- George Fermor, 3rd Earl of Pomfret (1768–1830)
- Thomas William Fermor, 4th Earl of Pomfret (1770–1833)
- George Fermor, 5th Earl of Pomfret (1824–1867)

== Coat of arms ==
Coat of arms of Earl of Pomfret
Coronet Earl's coronet Crest Issuant from a ducal coronet Or a cock's head Gules combed and wattled Or Escutcheon Argent a fess Sable between three lions' heads erased Gules Supporters On either side a lion proper Motto HONA E SEMPRE (Latin for 'Now and Always')

== See also ==
- Baron Hesketh

== Notes and references ==
Notes
