= Christopher Hatton, 1st Viscount Hatton =

English politician (1632–1706)

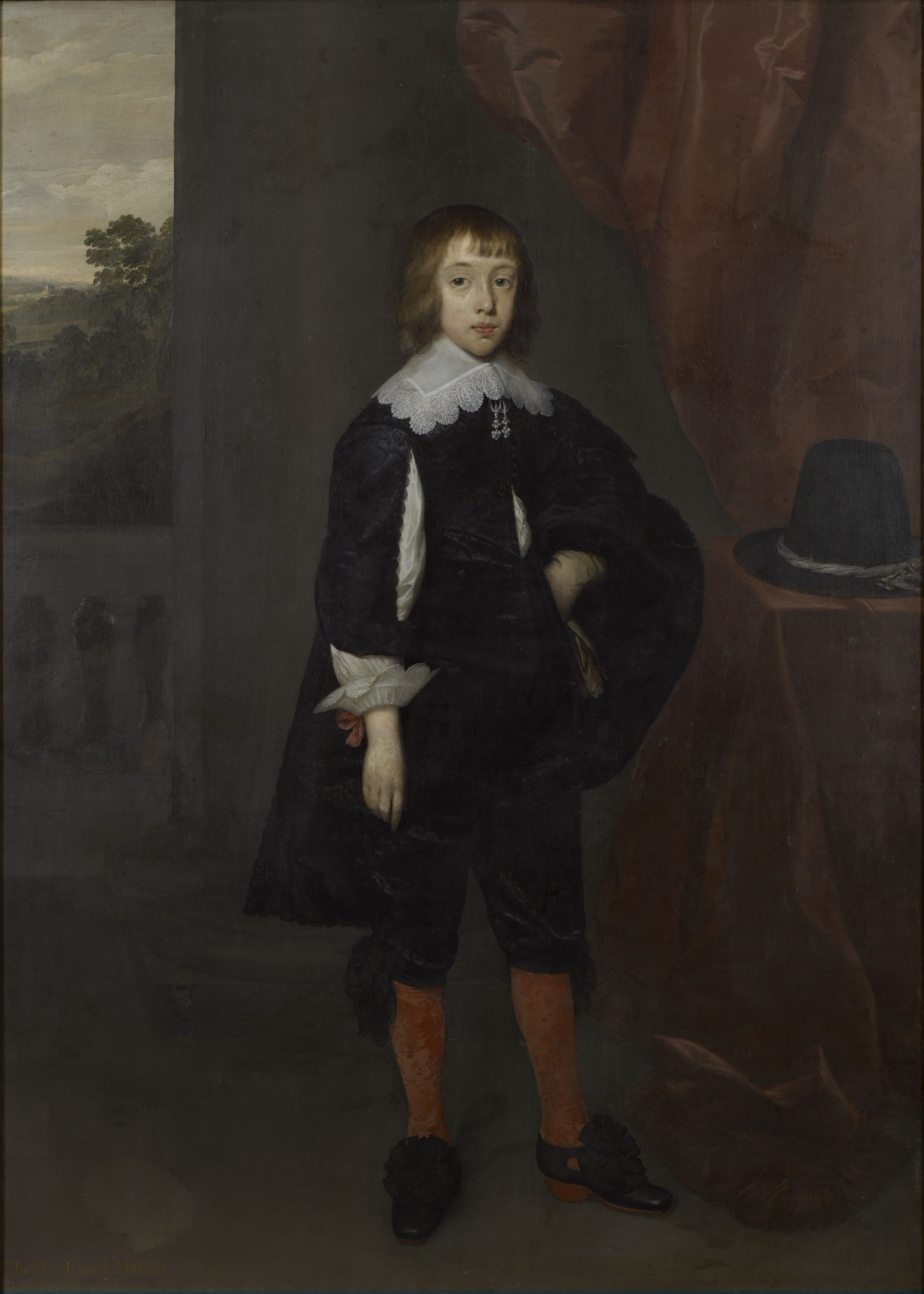
1641 portrait of Hatton by Cornelis Janssens van Ceulen

Christopher Hatton, 1st Viscount Hatton (1632 – September 1706) was an English politician who represented Northampton in the House of Commons of England from 1664 to 1670.

== Career ==
He succeeded his father, Christopher Hatton, 1st Baron Hatton, as 2nd Baron Hatton and also as governor of Guernsey in 1670. His mother was Elizabeth Montagu of Boughton.

He and his family were living in the governor's official residence, Castle Cornet, on 30 December 1672 when its keep and some living quarters were destroyed by an explosion; his mother and wife were killed. Hatton and his three young daughters were rescued by black servant James Chappell.

He continue to employ his father's steward and composer George Jeffreys to care for his family's Kirby Hall estate. Many of Jeffreys's letters are preserved in the Hatton-Finch correspondence; they cover a period of nearly forty years.

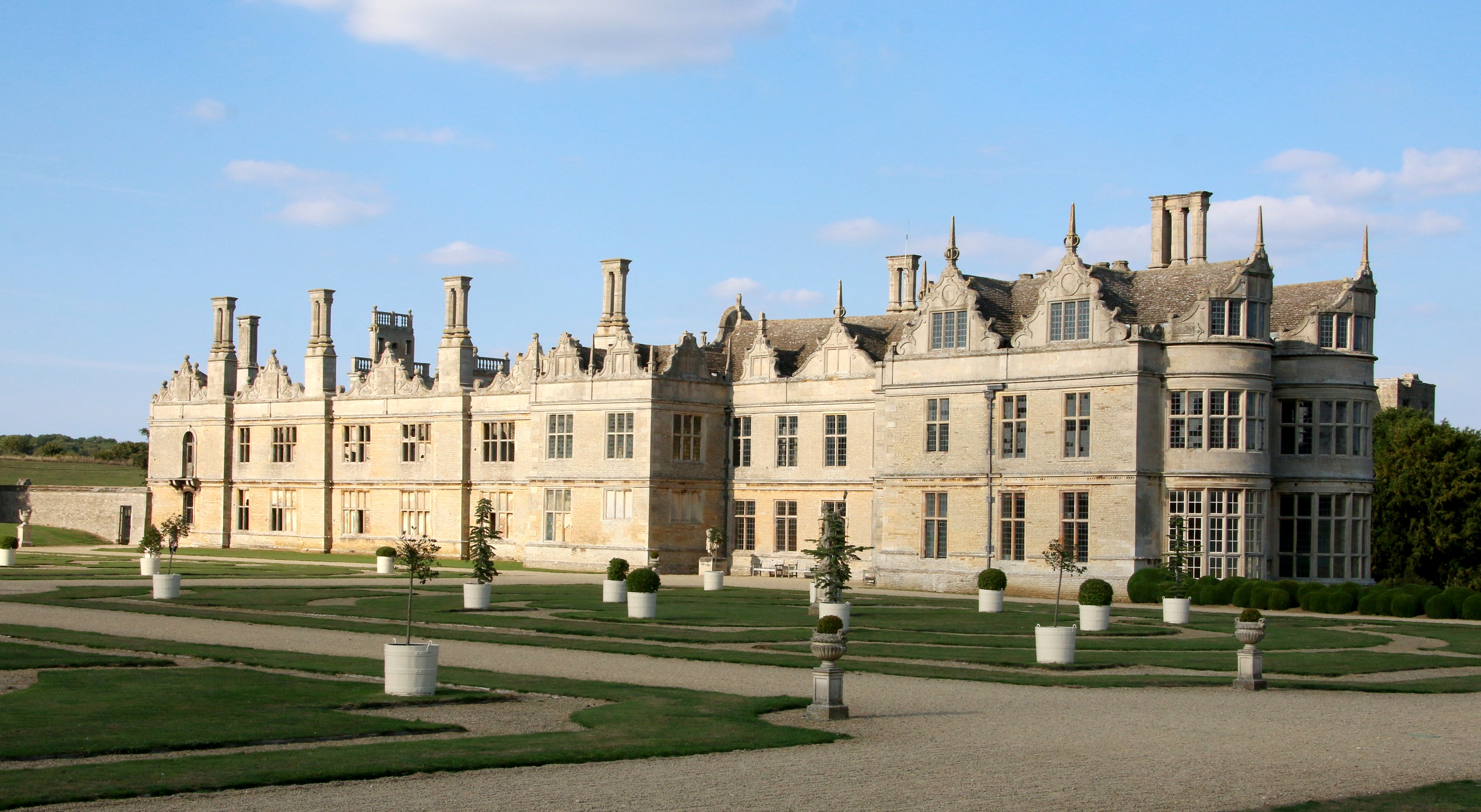
Kirby Hall, Gretton Corby, Northamptonshire.(Seat of the Hattons)

In 1682, he was created Viscount Hatton, of Gretton, Northamptonshire by King Charles II.

== Family ==
Christopher's younger brother was the botanist Charles Hatton.

He first married on 12 February 1667 to Lady Cecily Tufton (d. 1672), daughter of John Tufton, 2nd Earl of Thanet and Lady Margaret Sackville, daughter and heiress of 3rd Earl of Dorset and Lady Anne Clifford. They had the following issue:

- Anne Hatton (d. 1743), m. in 1685 to Daniel Finch, 2nd Earl of Nottingham, later 7th Earl of Winchilsea. Had many issues include Edward Finch-Hatton.
- Margaret Hatton (c. 1670)
- Elizabeth Hatton (c. 1672) and 1 more daughter.

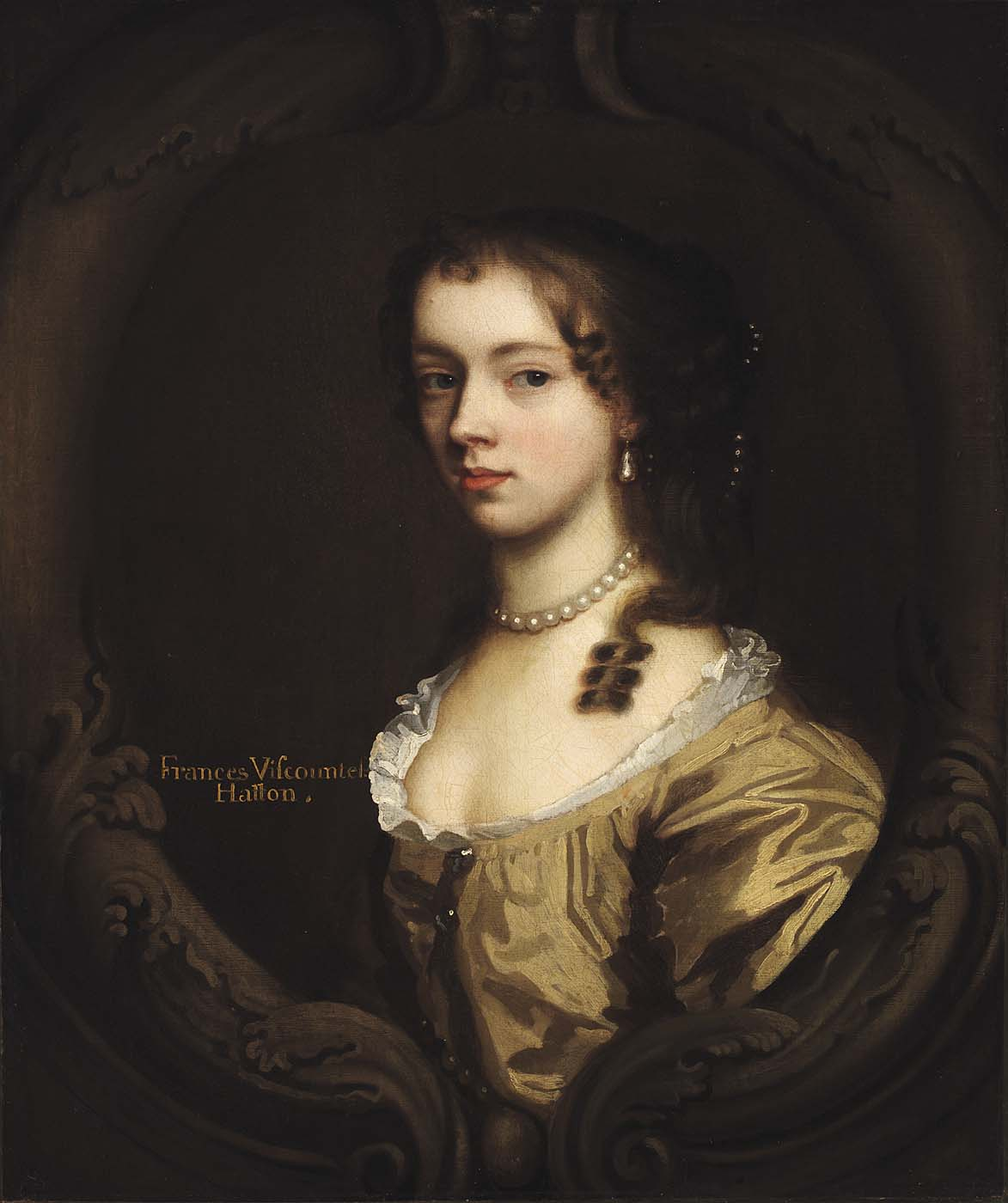
Viscountess Frances Hatton by Mary Beale

In 1676 he married secondly Frances Yelverton (d. 1684), daughter of Sir Henry Yelverton, 2nd Baronet. They had several children, but only one daughter survived infancy.

- Alice Elizabeth Hatton

In 1684 he had William Mason create monuments to his two wives and deceased children at Gretton. In 1706 he was buried in the same church.

In August 1685 he married as his third wife Elizabeth Haslewood (d. 1733), the daughter and heiress of Sir William Haslewood of Maidwell, Northamptonshire. Elizabeth was first cousin to Anne Finch, Countess of Winchilsea (wife of Heneage Finch, 5th Earl of Winchilsea). They had several children, including two sons:

- William, 2nd Viscount Hatton (1690–1760)
- Anna Maria Hatton (1697-1764)
- Henry Charles, 3rd Viscount Hatton (c. 1700–1762)

Elizabeth died in Kensington on 15 January 1733.

== Succession ==
Both his sons inherited the title Viscount Hatton in turn: William on his father's death in 1706, and Henry Charles for two years (1760–1762). As neither married, the title became extinct on the death of Henry Charles.

The family line continues with the Finch-Hattons, Earls of Winchilsea and Nottingham, whose ancestor, Daniel Finch, 7th Earl of Winchilsea and 2nd Earl of Nottingham, married Anne Hatton, daughter of the 1st Viscount Hatton.

== Bibliography ==
- Broadway, Jan (2004). "Hatton, Christopher, first Viscount Hatton (bap. 1632, d. 1706)". Oxford Dictionary of National Biography. Oxford Dictionary of National Biography (online ed.). Oxford University Press. doi:10.1093/ref:odnb/12607. (Subscription, Wikipedia Library access or UK public library membership required.)
- Burke, John (1841). A Genealogical and Heraldic History of the Extinct and Dormant Baronetcies of England, Ireland and Scotland. London: Scott, Webster, and Geary.
- Henning, Basil Duke (1983). The History of Parliament: the House of Commons 1660–1690. Woodbridge: Boydell and Brewer.
- Le Neve, Peter (1873). Le Neve's pedigrees of the knights made by King Charles II., King James II., King William III. and Queen Mary, King William alone, and Queen Anne. Harleian Society.

Parliament of England
Preceded by Richard Raynsford; Sir William Dudley	Member of Parliament for Northampton; 1664–1670; With: Richard Raynsford 1663–1664; Sir John Bernard 1664; Sir Henry Yelverton	Succeeded by Sir William Fermor; Lord Ibrackan
Peerage of England
New creation	Viscount Hatton; 1683–1706	Succeeded by William Hatton
Preceded by Christopher Hatton	Baron Hatton; 1670–1706	Succeeded by William Hatton
