= The Country House Revealed =

2011 British TV documentary

The Country House Revealed is a six-part BBC series first aired on BBC Two in May 2011. The series was accompanied by a full-length illustrated companion book published by the BBC.

== Premise ==
British architectural historian Dan Cruickshank visits six houses never before open to public view, and examines the lives of the families who lived there.

== Episodes ==
- Episode 1 tells the story behind South Wraxall Manor, hidden in the depths of the Wiltshire countryside. Built by a family with a dramatic and chequered history – the Longs – who rose in prominence through the Tudor period to become knights of the realm, friends of Henry VIII and Elizabeth I, and one of the most powerful dynasties in England.
- Episode 2 tells the story of architect Sir William Bruce and Kinross House.
- Episode 3 examines the architecture of Easton Neston in Northamptonshire and discusses whether it was the work of Nicholas Hawksmoor or Sir Christopher Wren.
- Episode 4 shows Wentworth Woodhouse near Rotherham, one of the largest country houses in Europe. The building exemplifies the workings of British parliamentary democracy before the Reform Act 1832, and is important in the history of Whig politics, its owners having included influential Prime Minister Charles Watson-Wentworth, 2nd Marquess of Rockingham. The episode also relates the near-destruction of the estate by controversial open-cast coal mining in the 1940s and 1950s, and speculates on how such a huge country house needing extensive renovation might find a use in the 21st century.
- Episode 5 looks at the Clandeboye Estate in Northern Ireland.
- Episode 6 views Marshcourt in Stockbridge, Hampshire, designed by Edwin Lutyens for stockbroker Herbert Johnson and completed in 1905. The gardens were designed by Gertrude Jekyll.

== Publication ==
The series was accompanied by a full-length illustrated companion book published by the BBC. The six chapters of the book correspond to the six episodes of the BBC series.
