= Fermor-Hesketh =

Fermor-Hesketh is a surname, and may refer to:

- Alexander Fermor-Hesketh, 3rd Baron Hesketh (born 1950), British Conservative politician
- Thomas Fermor-Hesketh, 1st Baron Hesketh (1881–1944), British soldier

== See also ==
- Fermor, surname
- Hesketh (disambiguation)
