= George Jeffreys (composer) =

English composer

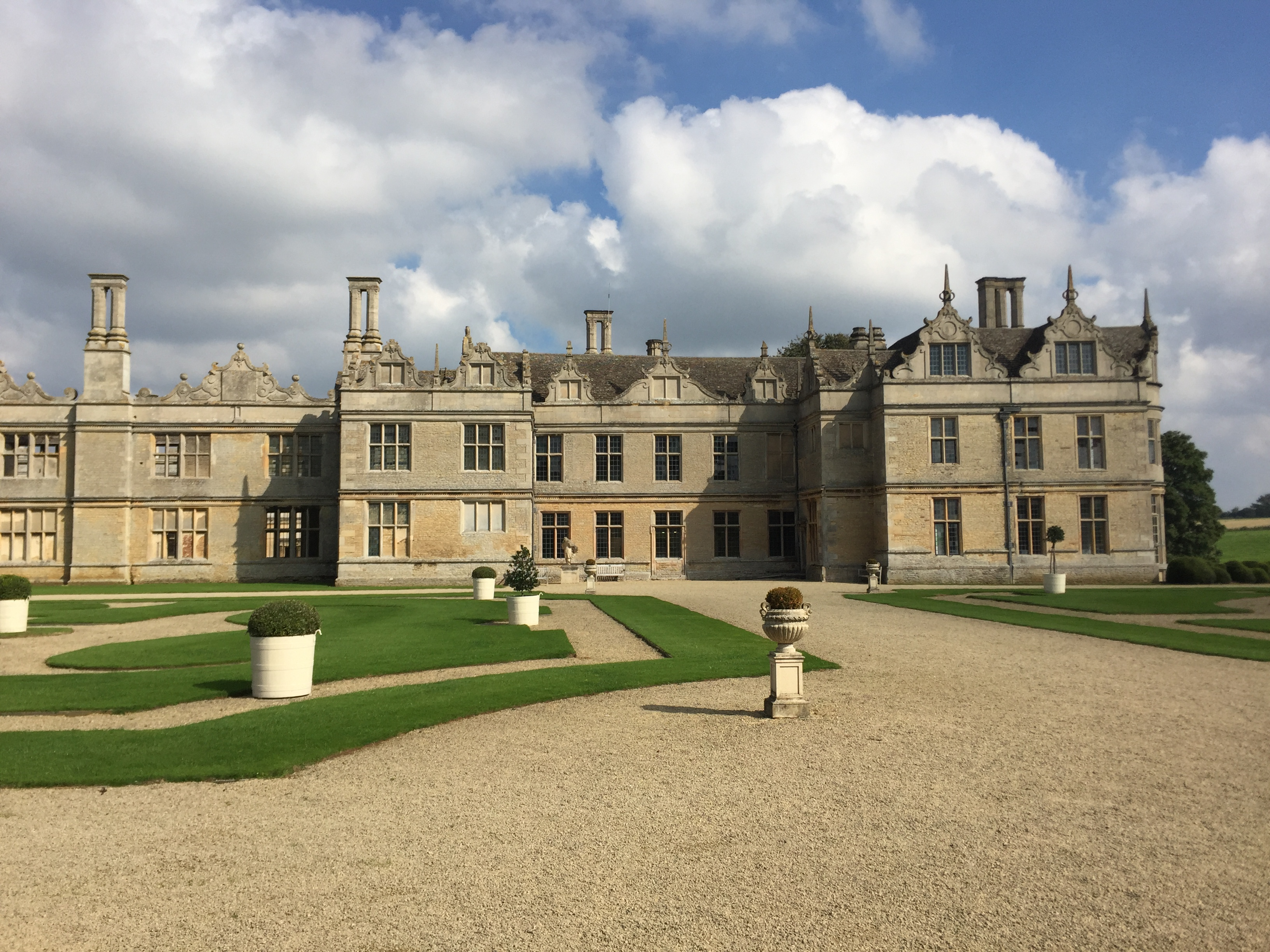
Kirby Hall, Northampthonshire

George Jeffreys (ca. 1610 – 4 or 5 July 1685) was an English composer during the period that saw the introduction of the Italian seconda pratica to northern Europe.

== Life ==
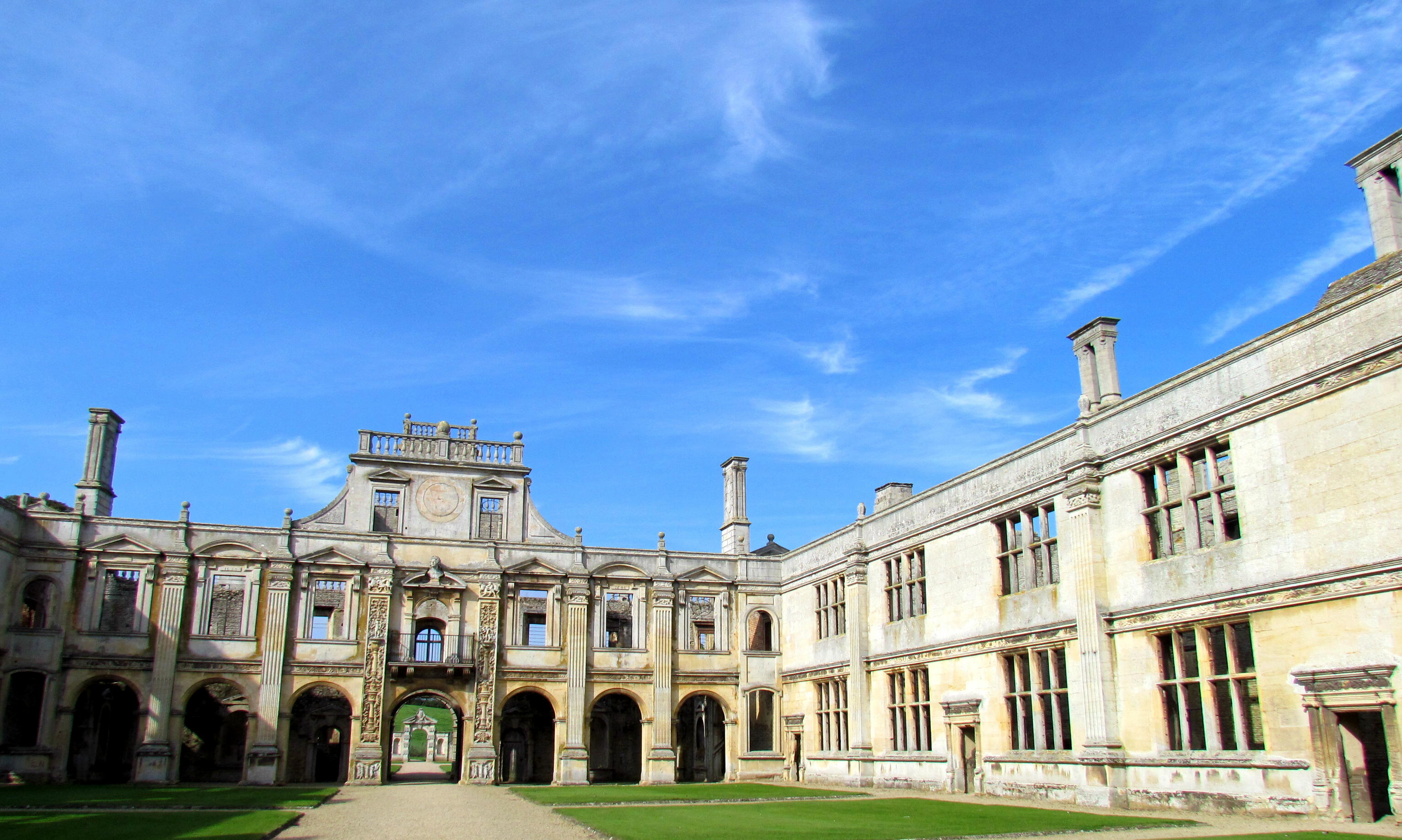
Kirby Hall's courtyard.

Jeffreys was organist to Charles I at Oxford in 1643. From about 1648 till his death he held the post of steward to the Hattons of Kirby, Northamptonshire (1st Baron Hatton and later his son 1st Viscount Hatton). Many of Jeffreys's letters are preserved in the Hatton-Finch correspondence; they cover a period of nearly forty years. From 1648 Jeffreys resided at Little Weldon. He died before 12 July 1685.

== Work ==
Jeffreys's anthem "Erit gloria Domini" is printed in the Cantica Sacra of 1672. He composed numerous anthems and motets, many of which are in manuscript in the Aldrich collection, Christ Church, Oxford. The library of the Royal College of Music also has music by this composer, as does British Library Addit. MS. 10338.

== Family ==
Jeffreys's son, Christopher Jeffreys (d. 1693) was also a musician. He was elected as a king's scholar of Westminster School to Christ Church, Oxford, in 1659, proceeded B.A. in 1663 and M.A. in 1666. Christopher and his wife Anna continued to live in his father's house at Little Weldon, Northamptonshire, up to the latter's death in July 1685. Christopher died in 1693. His son George Jeffreys was known for verse. A sister was privately married in 1669 to Henry Goode, rector of Weldon in 1684.
