= Sir Henry Yelverton, 2nd Baronet =

English politician

Sir Henry Yelverton, 2nd Baronet (6 July 1633 – 3 October 1670) was an English politician who sat in the House of Commons in 1660 and from 1664 to 1670.

== Early life ==
Yelverton was the son of Sir Christopher Yelverton, 1st Baronet and his wife Anne Twysden, daughter of Sir William Twysden, 1st Baronet and writer Lady Anne Finch. He inherited the baronetcy of Easton Maudit on the death of his father in 1654.

== Career ==
In 1660, Yelverton was elected Member of Parliament for Northamptonshire in the Convention Parliament. In 1664 he was elected MP for Northampton in the Cavalier Parliament and sat until his death in 1670 at the age of 37.

== Personal life ==
Yelverton married Susan Longueville, daughter of Charles Longueville, 12th Baron Grey de Ruthyn who became Baroness Grey de Ruthyn in her own right. Their daughter Frances Yelverton (d. 1684) married Christopher Hatton, 1st Viscount Hatton, while their son Charles inherited the barony and baronetcy.

Parliament of England
Preceded by Sir Gilbert Pickering, Bt	Member of Parliament for Northamptonshire; 1660; With: John Crew	Succeeded by Sir Justinian Isham, Bt; George Clerke
Preceded by The Hon. Christopher Hatton; Sir John Bernard	Member of Parliament for Northampton; 1664–1670; With: The Hon. Christopher Hatton	Succeeded by Sir William Fermor; Lord Ibrackan
Baronetage of England
Preceded by Christopher Yelverton	Baronet (of Easton Mauduit); 1654–1670	Succeeded by Charles Yelverton
