= George William Richard Fermor, 5th Earl of Pomfret =

English peer

George William Richard Fermor, 5th Earl of Pomfret (3 December 1824 - 8 June 1867) was an English peer.

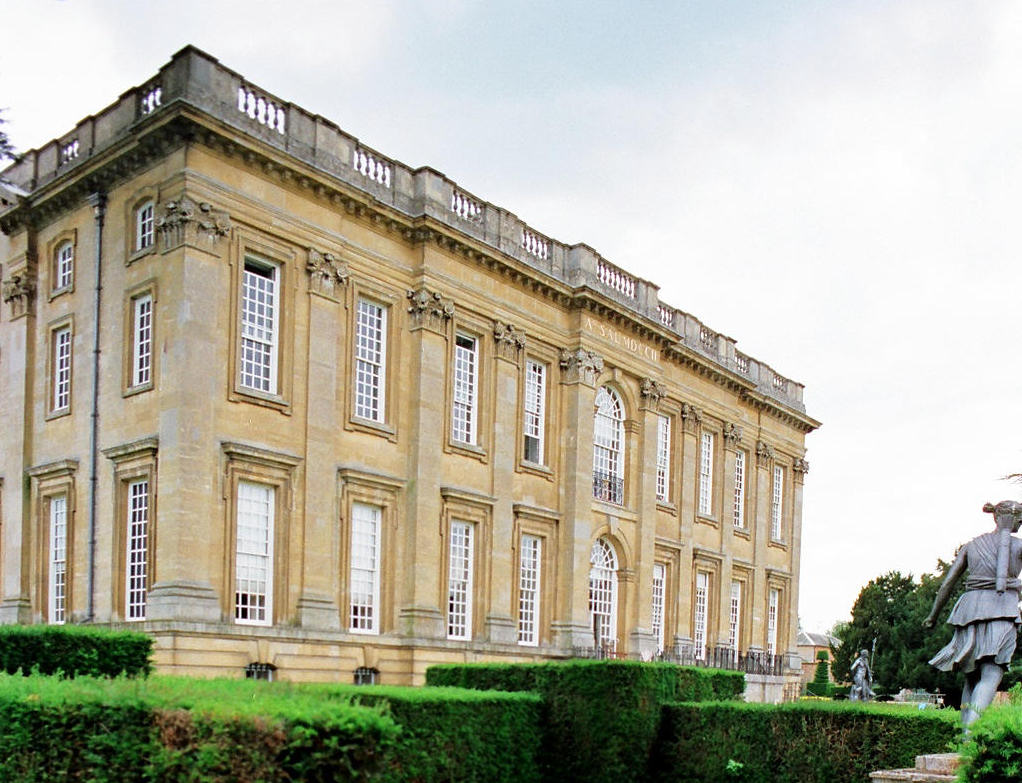
Easton Neston House, Northamptonshire

He was the eldest son of Thomas Fermor, 4th Earl of Pomfret, who he succeeded in 1833, inheriting Easton Neston house.

He died unmarried on 8 June 1867, when the earldom, barony, and baronetcy became extinct.

Easton Neston house passed to his sister's son Sir Thomas Henry Fermor-Hesketh, 6th Baronet, of Rufford in Lancashire, who then made Easton his seat and in 1935 was created Baron Hesketh.

Peerage of Great Britain
Preceded by Thomas Fermor	Earl of Pomfret; 1833–1867	Extinct
