= Sewardsley Priory =

English priory

Sewardsley Priory was a priory occupied by Cistercian nuns in Showsley near Towcester, West Northamptonshire, England.

The priory was established in the 12th century by a gift of Richard de Lestre during the reign of King Henry II.

Following the dissolution of the monasteries, the details of the location and arrangement of the Priory buildings had been lost until 2006. In that year, a portion of a building wall was found during a private excavation. This led to a brief but extensive archaeological study of the site.

The Channel 4 programme Time Team (series 14, episode 4), spent three days at the site during the 2007 digging season.

The programme first aired in January 2008, and has subsequently been re-aired on satellite TV channels.
