= Thomas Fermor, 4th Earl of Pomfret =

British army general (1770-1833)

Lieutenant-General The Right Honourable The Earl of Pomfret FRS
- Born: 12 October 1770
- Died: 29 June 1833 (aged 62); Easton Maudit
- Spouse: Amabel Elizabeth (m. 1823)
- Children: 4, including George
- Relatives: George Fermor, 3rd Earl of Pomfret (brother)
- Military career
- Allegiance: United Kingdom
- Branch: British Army
- Service years: 1791–1833
- Rank: Lieutenant-General
- Unit: Third Foot Guards
- Conflicts: French Revolutionary Wars; Flanders Campaign; Battle of Famars; Siege of Valenciennes; Battle of Lincelles; Siege of Dunkirk; Irish Rebellion of 1798; Anglo-Russian Invasion of Holland; Napoleonic Wars; Peninsular War; Second Battle of Porto; Battle of Bussaco; Battle of Fuentes d'Onoro; Siege of Ciudad Rodrigo; Battle of Salamanca; Siege of Burgos

Lieutenant-General Thomas William Fermor, 4th Earl of Pomfret, FRS (12 October 1770 – 29 June 1833), styled The Honourable Thomas Fermor until 1830, was an officer in the British Army who fought in the French Revolutionary and Napoleonic Wars.

== Early life ==
Fermor was the second son of George Fermor, 2nd Earl of Pomfret (1722–1785), by Miss Anna Maria Drayton of Sunbury, Middlesex.

== Military career ==
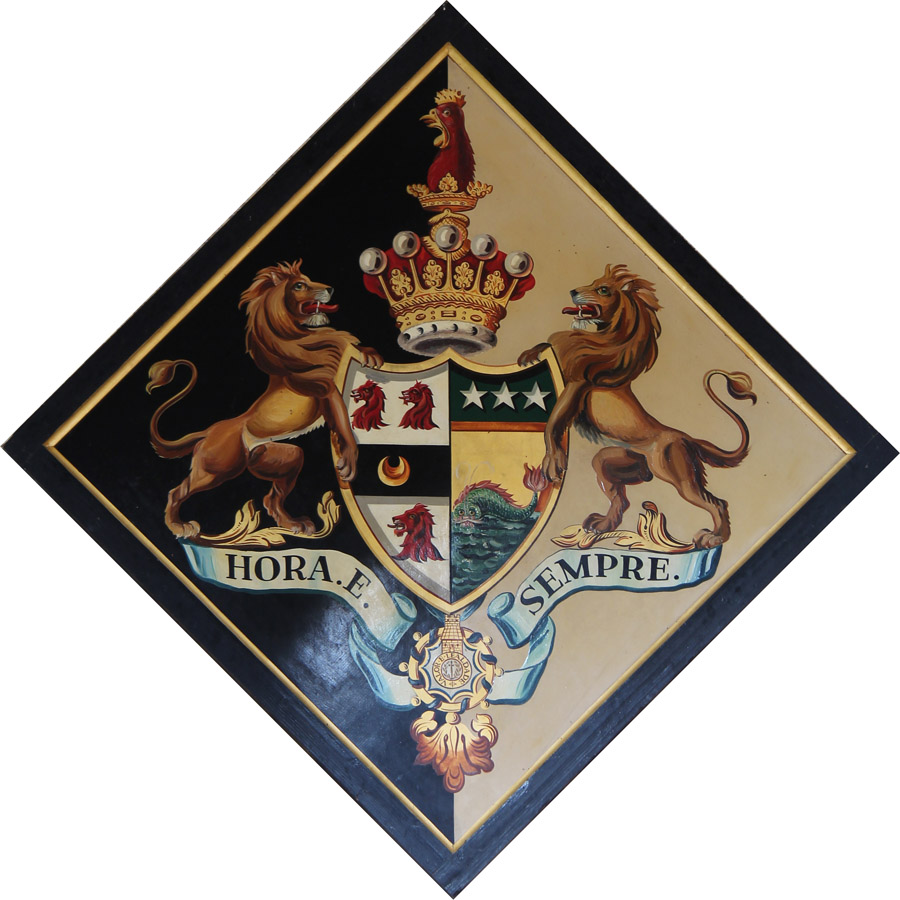
Funerary hatchment of Thomas Fermor, 4th Earl of Pomfret, displayed in St Mary's Church, Easton Neston, Northamptonshire

Fermor was appointed to an ensigncy in the 3rd Foot Guards. He served in Flanders in 1793, and was present at the Battle of Famars, the sieges of Valenciennes and Dunkirk, and the battle of Lincelles. In 1794 he was promoted to a lieutenancy. He served in Ireland during the rebellion, and in the Anglo-Russian invasion of Holland, where he took part in the several actions. On 16 March 1800 he was appointed to a company with the rank of lieutenant-colonel. He served with the guards in the Peninsula War until his promotion to the rank of major-general on 4 June 1813. For the Battle of Salamanca he received a medal; he was also a knight of the Portuguese Order of the Tower and Sword, which he obtained permission to accept 11 May 1813. His last commission as lieutenant-general bore the date 27 May 1825.

Fermor succeeded his brother George (1768–1830) as 4th Earl of Pomfret on 7 April 1830. Pomfret, who was elected a Fellow of the Royal Society in 1805 and was also a Fellow of the Society of Antiquaries.

== Personal life ==
On 13 January 1823 Lord Pomfret married Amabel Elizabeth Borough, eldest daughter of Sir Richard Borough, 1st Baronet (1756–1837). They had two sons and two daughters and he was succeeded in the earldom by his eldest son, George Fermor, 5th Earl of Pomfret.

Lord Pomfret died 29 June 1833. After his death, his widow Amabel married, secondly, in May 1834, William Thorpe, D.D., of Belgrave Chapel, Pimlico.

Peerage of Great Britain
Preceded by George Fermor	Earl of Pomfret; 1830–1833	Succeeded by George Richard; William Fermor
