= Sir William Fermor, 1st Baronet =

Royalist army officer of the English Civil War

Arms of Fermor: Argent, a fess sable between three lion's heads erased gules

Sir William Fermor, 1st Baronet (sometimes written as Farmer or Fermour) (1621 – 14 May 1661), was an officer in the Royalist army during the English Civil War. He stood for election as a Member of Parliament after the restoration of the monarchy in 1660, but died before a decision could be reached on whether he or another candidate had been elected.

== Early life ==
William Fermor was the eldest son of Sir Hatton Fermor, of Easton Neston, Northamptonshire, by his second wife, Anna, daughter of Sir William Cockayne, lord mayor of London. Sir Hatton Fermor, the great-grandson of Richard Fermor, was knighted by James I in 1603, and died in 1640, when Dame Anna applied for the wardship of her son, who was underage. William was born at Cokayne House, Old Broad Street, London, and was baptized on 7 November 1621 at St Peter le Poer. He matriculated from Exeter College, Oxford in 1636 but did not take a degree.

== Civil war ==
The year after his father's death, on 6 September 1641, William was created a baronet, by King Charles I, who also gave him the command of a troop of horse, and afterwards made him a Privy Councillor to Charles, Prince of Wales. He was appointed a commissioner of array for Northamptonshire in 1642, and served as a captain of the cavalry with the royalist forces at the Battle of Edgehill in October 1642, remaining in the army until 1645.

== First Commonwealth ==
Fermor lived peaceably, though with greatly diminished means, at Easton Neston during the Commonwealth. He had to compound for his estates to the amount of £1,400, being allowed, however, to collect his own rents on condition of paying them in to the use of the government. In 1651, the authorities having discovered that Fermor had four or five years before married Mary, daughter of Hugh Perry of London, and widow of Henry Noel, second son of Viscount Camden, who brought him an estate of £300, they obliged him to compound for that also.

Probably from a private grudge, efforts were made by two Northamptonshire gentlemen, John Willoughby and John Digby, on different occasions, to ruin his character with the government. Fermor was summoned before the council, but it having been proved that the reports against him were slanderous, and that Willoughby and Digby had each challenged him to fight a duel, they were sent to the Tower and forced to apologise to Fermor, while he was commended for his behaviour "as a man of honour".

== Protectorship ==
In 1655 a further charge was brought against Fermor of destroying the Protector's deer and encouraging deer-stealers, but, though summoned again before the council, no punishment is recorded.

== Second Commonwealth ==
A Major Farmer was sent in 1659 with a troop of horse to secure Carlisle for George Monck, but failed in the attempt, Richard Elton, who commanded in the city, inducing the soldiers to keep him out.

== Restoration ==
At the Restoration Fermor's fortunes revived. In May 1660 he took his seat on the privy council; and stood for parliament for the constituency of Brackley on the interest of his cousin, Thomas Wenman, 2nd Viscount Wenman. He was one of three candidates returned on 2 April, Fermor and Thomas Crew sharing in a double return. The matter was passed to the House to consider, but Fermor died before a resolution could be reached, after which the House ruled that Crew had been duly elected. Fermor was also appointed Deputy-Lieutenant for Northamptonshire. On 18 April he was created a Knight of the Bath, and on the 23rd took part in the coronation, his last appearance in public. He died three weeks afterwards, 14 May, a few days after the meeting of the Cavalier Parliament. Sir William was buried at Easton Neston.

== Family ==
Fermor in 1646 or 1647 married Mary (d. 1670), daughter of Hugh Perry of London, and widow of Henry Noel, second son of Edward, 2nd Viscount Campden. They had five sons and two daughters. The eldest son, William, was raised to the peerage by the title of Lord Leominster or Lempster in 1692, while his son and successor, Thomas, became the first earl of Pomfret in 1721.

Baronetage of England
New creation	Baronet (of Easton Neston); 1641–1661	Succeeded by William Fermor
