= George Fermor, 2nd Earl of Pomfret =

British peer (1722–1785)

George Fermor, 2nd Earl of Pomfret (1722–1785), styled Viscount Leominster or Lempster until 1753, of Easton Neston house, Northamptonshire was Earl of Pomfret in the Peerage of Great Britain.

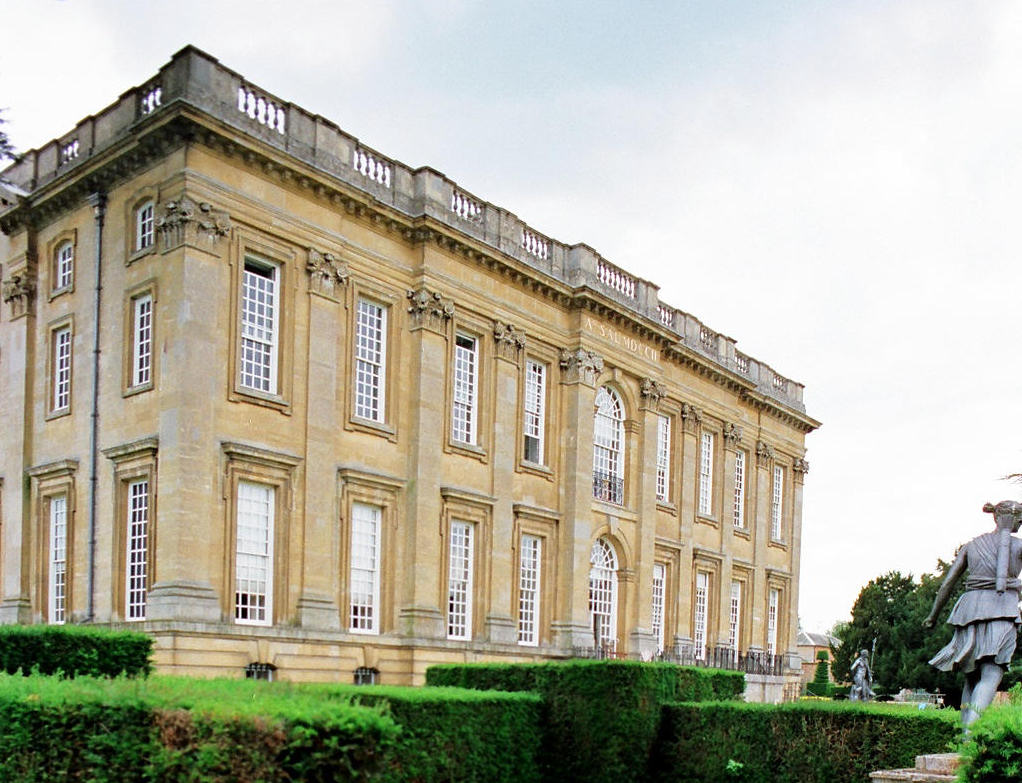
Easton Neston House, Northamptonshire

He was the eldest son of Thomas Fermor, 1st Earl of Pomfret and Henrietta Louisa Jeffreys. He entered the British Army in January 1739, as a lieutenant in Pearce's Regiment of Horse. On 11 February 1741/2, he was commissioned an ensign in the 2nd Regiment of Foot Guards. On 30 April 1743, he was promoted captain of a company in the 31st Regiment of Foot. By 1746, Lempster was a captain in Handasyd's Regiment. In December 1750, he lost £12,000 gaming with a Guards ensign. Lempster resigned his commission around January 1751/2. He fought a duel with swords with Captain Thomas Grey, of the Guards at Marylebone Fields, on 24 February 1752. Lempster killed Grey, and was convicted of manslaughter in April.

He succeeded to the title on his father's death in 1753, but lived so extravagantly that he had to sell the furnishings of his seat at Easton Neston, including his sculptures, previously part of the Arundel marbles and later bought by George's grandfather Baron Leominster. George's mother bought the sculptures from him and presented them to the University of Oxford.

In 1763, he became Gentleman of the Bedchamber and in 1771 he was made a privy counsellor.

== Marriage and issue ==
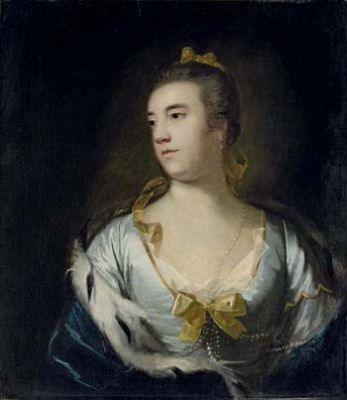
Anna Maria Delagard / Draycott, wife of the 2nd Earl of Pomfret. Portrait by Sir Joshua Reynolds

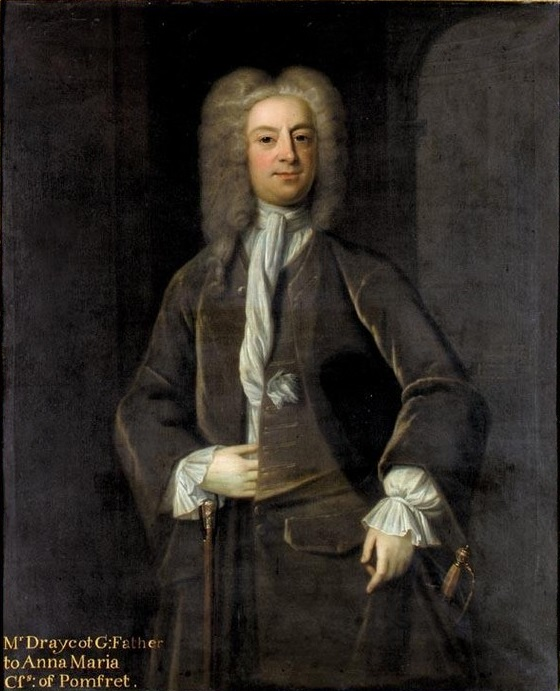
William Draycott (d.1753) of Chelsea and of Sunbury Court in Middlesex, portrait by Charles Jervas inscribed: "Mr Draycot G(rand) Father to Anna Maria Cts (Countess) of Pomfret". At Easton Neston until 2005

In 1764 at St. James's Church, Westminster, he married Anna Maria Delagard (c.1736-1787), sister of William Delagard of Bombay, and grand-daughter and heiress of William Draycott of Sunbury Court in Middlesex. She adopted the surname and arms of Draycott upon the death of her grandfather in 1753. Anna Maria inherited not only the Draycott estates but also a large fortune from Lady Mary Coke (d.1787), widow of Robert Coke, Esq, younger brother of Thomas Coke, 1st Earl of Leicester (1697-1759), and eldest sister of Philip Wharton, 1st Duke of Wharton (1698-1731). On her death in 1760, Lady Jane Coke bequeathed the valuable mineral mines centred on Fremington in Yorkshire, formerly the property of her brother the Duke of Wharton, in trust to a certain "Miss Anna Maria Draycott" (c.1736-1787), who was referred to as her "niece", possibly a sobriquet, "whom she had brought up" (i.e. from childhood), according to Clarkson (1814). The identity of Anna Maria is uncertain, she is called Anna Maria Delagard, "sister of William Delagard of Bombay", and "grand-daughter and heiress of William Draycott of Chelsea, county Middlesex" "and of Sunbury Court in Middlesex". She later adopted the surname Draycott, having also inherited the Sunbury estates of the Draycott family. Her gratitude to Lady Jane her benefactor is recorded on an inscribed monument she erected to her in St Mary's Church, Sunbury, where she was buried, but with no stated indication of the relationship. By his wife he had issue as follows:

- George Fermor, 3rd Earl of Pomfret (1768–1830), no issue
- Thomas Fermor, 4th Earl of Pomfret (1770–1833)
- Lady Charlotte Fermor (1766–1835), who married her drawing master Peter Denys (1760-1816) of Swiss ancestry. She lived at "The Pavillion" (or "Sloane Place") in Chelsea, next to the Chelsea estate of William Draycott, after whom is named Draycott Place and Avenue, and also inherited the Wharton mining interests at Fremington, Yorkshire.

Peerage of Great Britain
Preceded by Thomas Fermor	Earl of Pomfret; 1753–1785	Succeeded by George Fermor
