= Towcester Racecourse =

Horse racing venue in Towcester, England

Coordinates: 52°7′41″N 0°58′22″W

Towcester

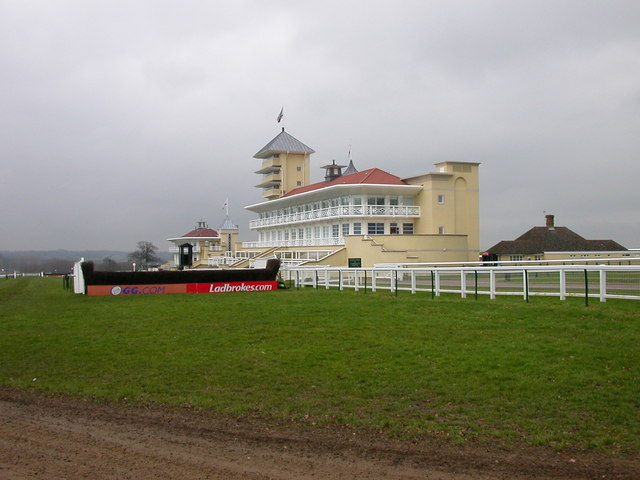
- The grandstand
- Interactive map of Towcester
- Location: Watling Street, Towcester, Northamptonshire
- Owned by: TRC Events & Leisure Ltd.
- Date opened: 1928 (initial); 2027 (planned reopening)
- Date closed: 2018
- Screened on: Sky Sports Racing
- Course type: National Hunt

Towcester Racecourse is a greyhound racing track and former horse racing venue at Towcester (pronounced "Toh-ster") in Northamptonshire, England. It has staged the English Greyhound Derby in 2018, 2021 and had won the contract for 5 years in 2022, prior to entertaining into administration.

== Horse racing ==
Horse racing at Towcester goes back to the 18th century. Towcester is one of many places listed in James Christie Whyte's History of the British Turf where annual horseracing had ceased to occur after 1798.

The first meeting over the modern course took place in 1928. The Towcester Racecourse Company was formed under the direction of Sir Thomas Fermor-Hesketh, later 1st Lord Hesketh, and it was there on his estate of Easton Neston, that the course was sited, and the first grandstand built.

Towcester was popular among the racing fraternity, mostly because of the sharp bends in the course, and the final gallop to the finishing post was uphill, which tested the horses and results in some unexpected finishes.

In 2004, the Easton Neston estate, including the race course, was put up for sale. The third Lord Hesketh later decided to retain ownership of the course and sold only a portion of the estate to a Russian-born businessman.

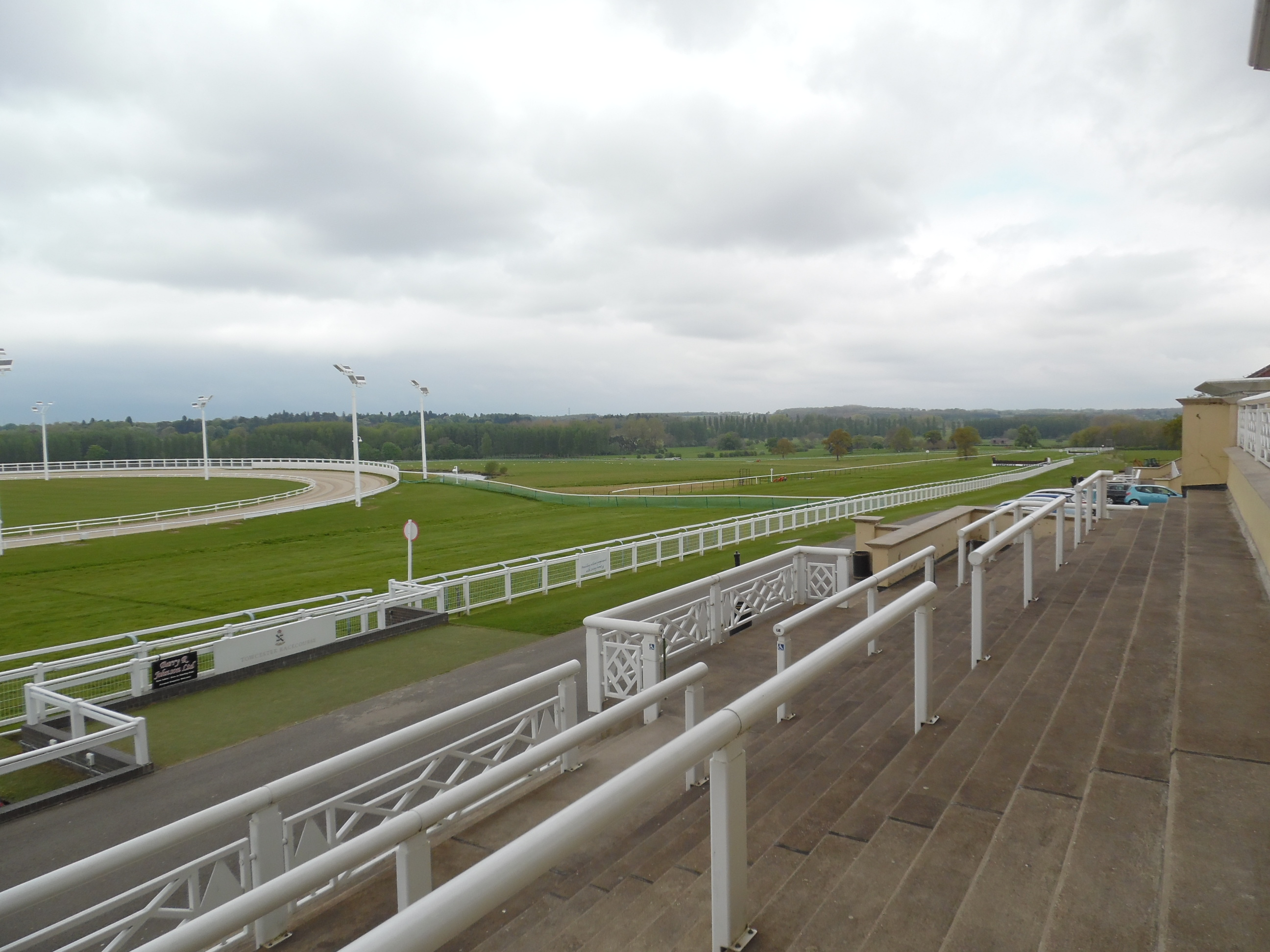
The home straight from the stands

Entry was free from 2002 until 2006, during which time the course saw attendance grow significantly. In mid-2006, it was announced that from the 26th of December 2006, Towcester would be charging for entry to their two most popular annual meetings; Boxing Day and Easter Sunday. Selected other meetings were free.

In 2008, Lord Hesketh decided to sell the course, which was offered as a going concern.

On 7 November 2013, jockey Tony McCoy got his 4,000th career win at Towcester, riding Mountain Tunes to win the Weatherbys Novices' Hurdle.

== Greyhound racing ==
A greyhound racing track has been built inside the racecourse, which opened in December 2014.

== 2018 administration ==
In August 2018 the future of Towcester racecourse was put in doubt. A statement released by the racecourse on 16 August read:

Towcester Racecourse Company Limited, proprietors of Towcester Racecourse, are currently experiencing trading difficulties and are in discussions with key stakeholders and professional advisers on the way forward. However, the directors have concluded that they have no alternative in the short term but to seek court protection and are now taking steps to place the company into administration. As a result, it is with regret that the greyhound meetings on this Friday, 17 August, and over the weekend at Towcester Racecourse have been cancelled.

Whilst inevitably there will be considerable interest from customers, supporters and suppliers, the directors ask that they be given time to focus on exploring other options for the business and they anticipate there will be a further update in the next few days.

The directors remain hopeful that despite the current situation, given the significant history of horseracing and more recently greyhound racing at Towcester, there will be significant interest from potential acquirers".

On 23 August KPMG were appointed as administrators and 134 out of 137 members of staff at the racecourse were made redundant, many having to claim statutory redundancy from the government. On 13 November, the administrators announced that the racecourse's assets were being sold to a company called Fermor Land LLP. This company was formed on 18 October (26 days before the sale) and is headed by Lord Hesketh's brother-in-law Mark Westropp, a trustee of the Hesketh Family trusts.

In late October 2019 Kevin Boothby signed a 10-year lease deal for Towcester Racecourse. Boothby stepped down as promoter in September 2025 and a new 10-year lease was signed with Orchestrate, headed by Mike Davis. Orchestrate took over the operation of greyhound racing at Towcester from 31 October 2025.

There has been much discussion since the closure of horse racing returning to Towcester, with point-to-point meetings in early 2027 announced in June 2026, with hopes to resume racing under rules later in 2027. The return of horse racing for the 2027–28 season was confirmed in September 2026, with the first fixture scheduled for 20 October 2027.
