= George Fermor, 3rd Earl of Pomfret =

British peer (1768-1830)

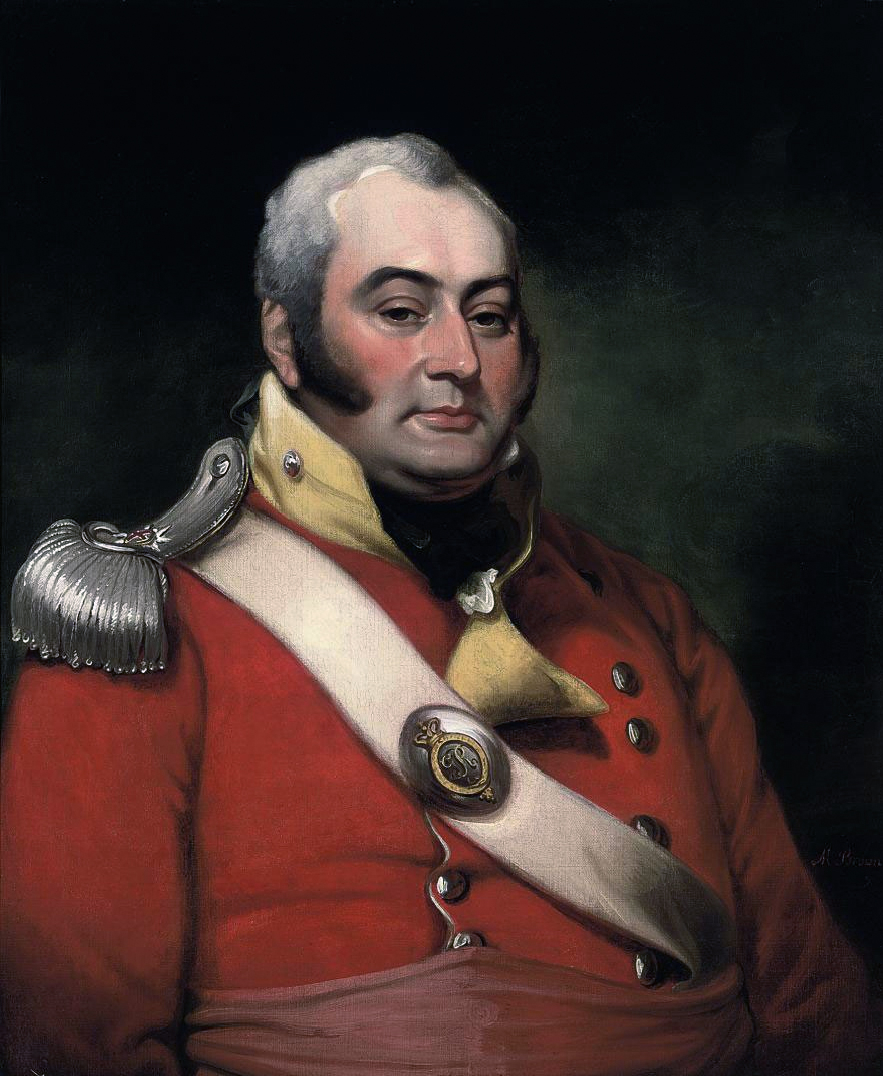
The 3rd Earl in the uniform of a Captain in the Northamptonshire Militia, a rank he held from 1804.

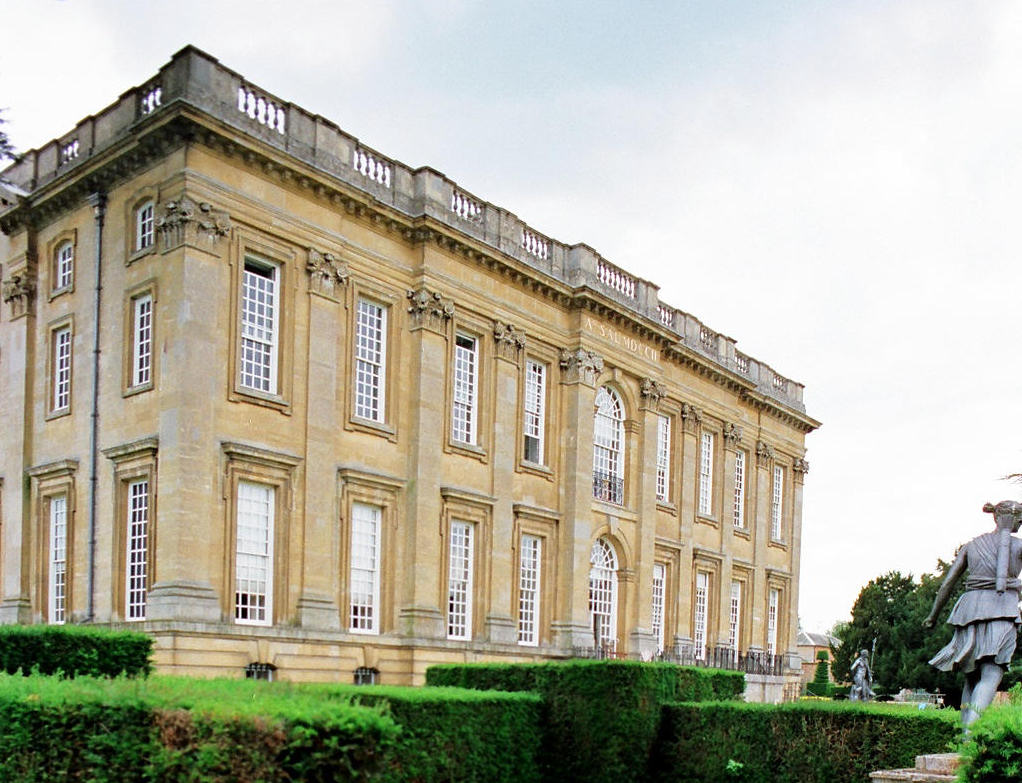
Easton Neston House, Northamptonshire

George Fermor, 3rd Earl of Pomfret (6 January 1768 – 7 April 1830) was the third holder of the title of Earl of Pomfret in the Peerage of Great Britain.

He was the eldest son of George Fermor, 2nd Earl of Pomfret and succeeded to the title on his father's death in 1785, inheriting the family seat of Easton Neston house, Northamptonshire.

On 29 August 1793 he married Mary Browne (c.1769-1839), daughter and heiress of Thomas Trollope Browne, a wine merchant. However, they separated soon afterwards and had no issue, meaning that on his death in 1830 the earldom and estate passed to his younger brother Thomas.

He was laid to rest in St Mary's church on the Easton Neston estate, where he is commemorated by a white marble funerary monument of a lifesize male figure seated by an urn. The monument was carved by Edward Hodges Baily.

Peerage of Great Britain
Preceded by George Fermor	Earl of Pomfret; 1785–1830	Succeeded by Thomas Fermor
