= Easton Neston =

Village in Northamptonshire, England

Coordinates: 52.15°N 0.96°W

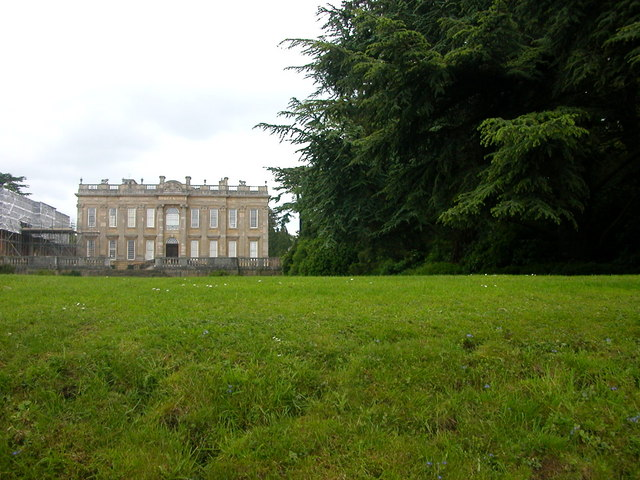
- Easton Neston House

- Location within Northamptonshire
- Interactive map of Easton Neston
- Population: 88 (2021)
- OS grid reference: SP704493
  - London: 66 miles (106 km)
- Civil parish: Easton Neston
- Unitary authority: West Northamptonshire
- Ceremonial county: Northamptonshire
- Region: East Midlands
- Country: England
- Sovereign state: United Kingdom
- Post town: Towcester
- Postcode district: NN12
- Dialling code: 01327
- Police: Northamptonshire
- Fire: Northamptonshire
- Ambulance: East Midlands
- UK Parliament: South Northamptonshire

Easton Neston is a civil parish and former village in south Northamptonshire, England, north-east of Towcester on the A43 road.

The village was inhabited until around 1500, while the rural parish now contains the hamlets of Hulcote and Showsley. At the 2021 census, the parish had a population of 88, and about 1,800 acres (730 ha) of mainly farmland and woods.

The village's name means 'Eadstan's farm/settlement' or 'Aethelstan's farm/settlement'.

== Buildings ==
=== Estate ===
Easton Neston house was built for Sir William Fermor in 1685-1695 and remodelled by Nicholas Hawksmoor, 1700–1702. It was built on the site of Easton Neston village and required re-routing the main Oxford to Northampton road to the west. The grounds also have 18th century stables and a temple dated 1641. There are entrance lodges on the old Towcester Road north-west and south-west of the house of about 1822. There is a public footpath which runs from the north-west lodge east to Hulcote.

The Parish Church of St Mary is on the south side of Easton Neston estate and in the Church of England's Diocese of Peterborough. Its origins are 13th century and it has box pews. There are several monuments to the Fermor-Hesketh family from the main house including Sir Richard Fermor (d.1552).

Towcester Racecourse is in the southern part of the estate.

=== Showsley ===
In Showsley are the remains of Sewardsley Priory, a 12th-century Cistercian monastery. The area was explored by Channel 4's archaeological television programme Time Team in 2007 and the episode, called "The Naughty Nuns of Northamptonshire", first screened on 27 January 2008. The dig found the priory church, about 90 feet by 20 feet in size; and the cloister, measuring about 45 feet square. There were some striking floor tiles decorated with images of a dog and others with a flower; and large amounts of pottery. The team also looked at what was thought to have been an antiquarian garden feature. This was found to be actually graves, complete with the remains of the people who had been buried there. Two were of particular interest. These had not been cut together but were finished off together, suggesting that their occupants were connected in some way.

=== Railway ===
Part of the trackbed of the dismantled Stratford-upon-Avon and Midland Junction Railway (SMJR) runs east to west between Showsley and north of Hulcote towards the site of Towcester Station, now the site of a Tesco supermarket. The line ran from Towcester to Stoke Bruerne, then east, crossing the West Coast Main Line into Bedfordshire. The line opened in 1891 and it joined the line from Blisworth to Towcester just north of what is now the roundabout at the junction of the A5 and A43 near Towcester.

== Former industries ==
The parish was not always as agricultural as it now appears. Quarries for either iron ore or limestone existed in the 1870s in the vicinity of Showsley and Shutlanger. The quarries were obviously small and it is not clear where they were. The stone was taken away by horse and cart. A larger iron ore operation began north of Hulcote in 1873. A branch railway was constructed to take the ore away. This joined the line from Blisworth to Towcester south of Tiffield. The junction faced Blisworth. An ironworks was constructed at the junction which smelted the Hulcote ore between 1875 and 1882 when the works closed. The quarries at Hulcote operated with short breaks until 1920.

The first Hulcote iron ore quarries were on the east side of the Northampton to Towcester road on both sides of the minor road to Showsley. A clay pit was dug close by on the west side of the main road and a brick works built next to it to make bricks from the clay. Sidings were installed on the railway branch to serve the works. The brickworks and claypit operated until about 1900.

In 1891, when the SMJR was built next to the quarries and brickworks, the existing branch railway was made redundant and the ore and bricks were taken away by the new line. The new junction at Towcester faced towards Towcester and Banbury and the junction at Olney faced Bedford. A new iron ore quarry was started on the west side of the main road to the north of the old claypit in about 1908 which was in use until the other Hulcote quarries closed in 1920. A separate iron ore quarry operated close to Round Spinney at Showsley close to the SMJR. It was there by 1909 and closed some time between 1913 and 1920.

The quarrying was done by hand, with the assistance of explosives in the westernmost iron quarry, but from 1914 two steam machines were used to strip the overburden in that western quarry. Short narrow gauge tramways connected the claypit to the brickworks and the iron ore quarries to the railway sidings. The tramways were operated by horses and, from 1908, by steam locomotives.

The claypit is now filled with water. There are remains of the quarrying and the tramways and railways although some of the quarried area has been restored for farming and some remains have been obliterated by the widening and diversion of the A43. Some of the remains are hidden by trees. The remains of a bridge under which a tramway ran can be seen on the minor road to Showsley where the road turns sharply to the left (travelling eastwards)

== See also ==
- List of monastic houses in Northamptonshire
