= Easton Neston house =

Country house near Towcester, Northamptonshire, England

Coordinates: 52.1373°N 0.9758°W

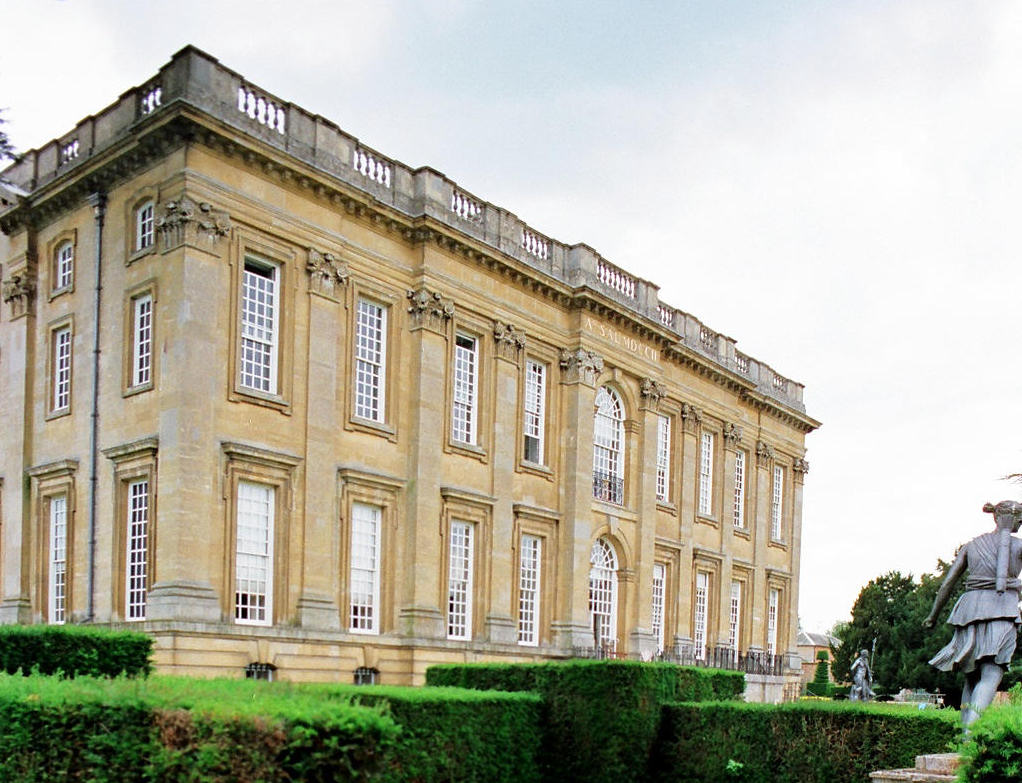
Easton Neston House in 1987

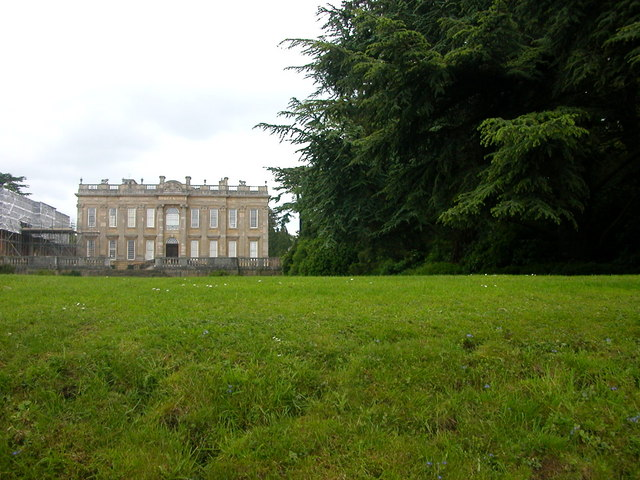
Easton Neston undergoing building work in 2007

Easton Neston is a large grade I listed country house in the parish of Easton Neston near Towcester in Northamptonshire, England. It was built by William Fermor, 1st Baron Leominster (1648–1711), in the Baroque style to the design of the architect Nicholas Hawksmoor.

Easton Neston is thought to be the only mansion which was solely the work of Hawksmoor. From about 1700, after the completion of Easton Neston, Hawksmoor worked with Sir John Vanbrugh on many buildings, including Castle Howard and Blenheim Palace, and often provided technical knowledge to the less qualified Vanbrugh. Hawksmoor's work was always more classically severe than Vanbrugh's. However, Easton Neston predates this partnership by some six years.

== Architect ==
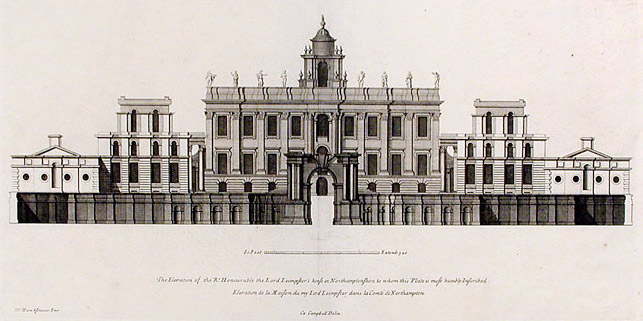
A proposal for Easton Neston published in Vitruvius Britannicus in 1715; the central block was built in accordance with the proposal except that the cupola was not added to the roof and the flanking wings, gateway, and forecourt walls shown were ultimately not built.

Hawksmoor was commissioned to re-build the old manor house at Easton Neston by Sir William Fermor, later created Baron Leominster, who had inherited the estate from his father Sir William Fermor, 1st Baronet (1621–1661), who had himself inherited it in 1640 and had been created a baronet the following year by King Charles I. Hawksmoor had been recommended to Fermor by his cousin by marriage Sir Christopher Wren, who in about 1680 had advised on the building of a new mansion on the site.

No details of what Wren envisaged survive, and work seems to have ceased following completion of the two service blocks, of which only one survives. Following Fermor's marriage in 1692 to the wealthy heiress Catherine Poulett, he decided to resurrect the idea of a new mansion, and subsequently Wren's pupil Hawksmoor received the commission in about 1694. A 300-word letter written and signed by Wren in approximately 1685 has survived, reflecting the advice he offered concerning the construction of Easton Neston. The letter was acquired in March 2011 at auction for an estimated £9,000, and later sold for £19,200.

In May 2011, BBC broadcast a programme on Easton Neston, The Country House Revealed, narrated by British architectural historian Dan Cruickshank. The programme explored the question of whether Wren or Hawksmoor designed the building. Cruickshank obtained samples of wood from the building's roof; date tests on the samples revealed they originated from trees that were cut down between 1700 and 1701, which was proposed as evidence suggesting that Hawksmoor, not Wren, may have been the architect.

== Exterior ==
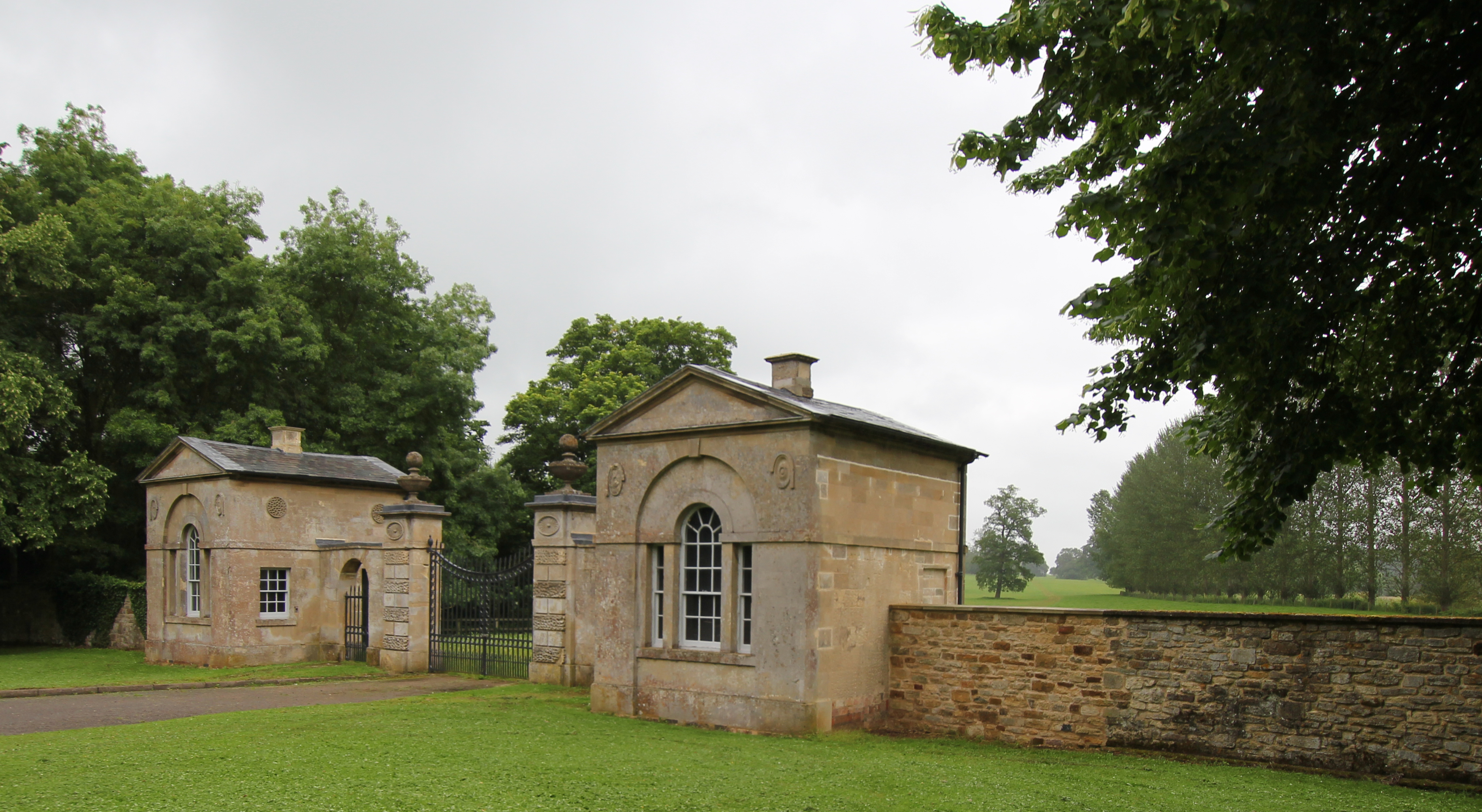
The south entrance lodges to Easton Neston on the Old Towcester Road, with the estate and the tree-lined River Tove visible in the background

Fermor had purchased a large collection of marble statues from the Arundel collection some of which he used to decorate the estate. These were removed and sold together with other items by George Fermor, 2nd Earl of Pomfret (1722–1785) (son of the 1st Earl), then in financial difficulties, and were bought by his mother Henrietta Jeffreys, daughter of John Jeffreys, 2nd Baron Jeffreys of Wem, who in 1755 donated them to the Ashmolean Museum in Oxford.

The house Hawksmoor built at Easton Neston can best be described as a miniature palace that owes the colossal order of pilasters and crowning balustrade to the proposed design by Gabriel of the Petit Trianon at Versailles, which building was not completed until about 50 years after Easton Neston, engravings of which design were published in Vitruvius Britannicus. Gabriel's design was itself influenced by the palazzi on the Campidoglio in Rome by Michelangelo (d.1564). Both main façades of Easton Neston are of simple design, devoid of ostentation.

The rectangular house comprises three principal floors. The lowest is a rusticated basement, above ground level, with the two floors above appearing to have equal value, including nine bays divided by Composite pilasters, each bay containing a tall, slim sash window of the same height on each floor. The central bay contains the entrance, flanked by two Composite full columns. These two columns support a small, round-headed pediment displaying the Fermor arms and heraldic motto. Above the door at second floor height is a massive Venetian window. The roof-line is concealed by a balustrade which is decorated by covered stone urns at the ten intervals above the pilasters below. The design and fenestration of the entrance façade is repeated at the rear on the garden façade, except that the roof balustrade at the rear is undecorated by urns and pediment. The house is built of Helmdon stone, a cream stone of exceptional quality, which has ensured that the carving appears as crisp today as it was on completion of the house in 1702.

The two side elevations of the house tell the story of life in a country house before the age of the servants' bell. Until the invention of the remote bell situated in the servants' hall, which could be jangled by a system of ropes and pulleys from far away, it was necessary for servants to be located within earshot of a hand-bell or call of the voice. In older houses such as Montacute House servants slept on the floor of the great hall or outside the door of their master's bedchamber; by the 17th century this arrangement was becoming undesirable. Houses then began to have corridors, and the owners, rather than stepping over sleeping servants, began to tidy them away in small rooms, sometimes containing their employer's close-stool. However, these small rooms still had to be within calling distance.

In a brand-new, luxurious house such as Easton Neston, this was achieved by inserting two very low-ceilinged mezzanine staff floors between each of the two upper floors. Hence at Easton Neston, while the two principal façades (West and East) are of three floors, the fenestration of the two less important side façades betrays the secret that there are in fact five floors: the windows of the two mezzanines, as befits the humble rooms they light, are a mere half of the size of those of the grander rooms above and below them. This makes the fenestration of the side façades a complex and interesting sight.

Some years after completion of the house in 1702, Hawksmoor drew-up further plans for a huge entrance court. These designs, never fully executed but published in Vitruvius Britannicus, would have flanked the existing rectangular house with two wings, one containing stables and the other service rooms. The fourth (entrance) side of the courtyard was to have been an elaborate colonnade.

No substantial part of this later scheme was built, except for two large and now decayed Ozymandian entrance piers, marooned in the park. The two pre-existing red-brick wings, perhaps owing something to Christopher Wren, remained, although the western (stable) wing was later demolished after the new stables were built. Some architectural commentators, including Dan Cruickshank feel that Hawksmoor's mansion might have been spoilt by this new scheme, which owed more to Sir John Vanbrugh's architectural concepts than to Hawksmoor's. The whole proposed new design was depicted in Colen Campbell's 1715 work Vitruvius Britannicus, as though it had in fact been built.

== Interior ==
The principal rooms have windows rising almost from the floor to the ceiling. The rooms are large and well proportioned without suffering from the oppressive grandeur that was to be a feature of Vanbrugh and Hawksmoor's later collaborative work. The massive main staircase, with its wrought iron balustrade in the style of Jean Tijou, comprises two long, shallow flights ascending to the first floor gallery which is decorated with grisailles painted by Sir James Thornhill.

Interiors at Easton Neston have suffered various changes since Hawksmoor completed the house. Hawksmoor's great hall, with its two-storey high, bare walls and flanking vestibules and Corinthian columns, was sub-divided in the 19th century by Sir Thomas Hesketh, who inherited the property from his uncle, to create an upper storey containing three bedrooms. The principal drawing room, the only heavily decorated room in the house, has also seen change in the form of decorative plasterwork carried out by Artari in the mid-18th century for Thomas Fermor, 1st Earl of Pomfret (1698–1753), comprising a high-relief ceiling matched on the walls by huge scrolled panels and picture surrounds, with trophies containing hunting emblems.

A description of the exterior, some principal rooms and art works by Brian Fairfax was published in 1758.

== Gardens ==
In the park, Hawksmoor also designed a canal to complement the house, known as the Long Water; this is on an axis with the entrance door at the centre of the garden façade. In the 20th century the gardens overlooked by the west, or garden façade, were further enhanced by the creation of a water terrace, by Thomas Fermor-Hesketh, 1st Baron Hesketh (1881–1944), the great-nephew of the 5th and last Earl of Pomfret. It is decorated by box topiary and roses surrounding a large pool, which reflects the house in its water.

== History ==
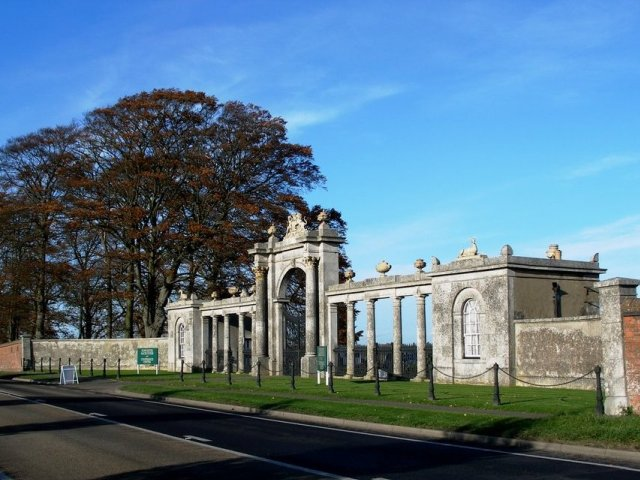
The Easton Neston gate at Towcester Racecourse

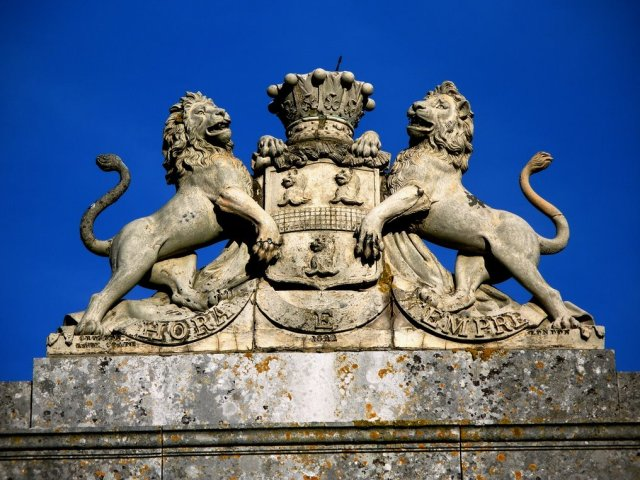
The Easton Neston gate at Towcester Racecourse, showing the Fermor arms

For the major part of its existence, including into the 21st century, Easton Neston has been a private house and never opened to the public; as a consequence it is little known.

In March 1876, Empress Elisabeth of Austria visited England and rented Easton Neston House, using its fine stables for her horses. She used Blisworth railway station for travel to London.

In 2004, Alexander Fermor-Hesketh, 3rd Baron Hesketh, a descendant of the builder via a female line, put the house, and the surrounding estate including Towcester Racecourse, up for sale for an asking price of £50 million. He received no offers and consequently in 2005, he sold the estate piecemeal. A part of the estate, including the main house, some outlying buildings and 550 acres (2.2 km^{2}) of land, were sold for about £15 million to Leon Max, a retail businessman and designer. Lord Hesketh subsequently sold off the farmland and the Gothic village of Hulcote, but retained ownership of Towcester Racecourse.

As of 2005, Max planned to use the Wren-designed wing of the house as a headquarters for his European operations, and the Hawksmoor block as his personal residence.

== The Hesketh Library ==
The library at Easton Neston was formerly the home of a substantial collection of rare books and manuscripts, largely created by Frederick Fermor-Hesketh, 2nd Baron Hesketh. In 2006 the collection was deposited on loan at the library of Lancaster University, the Hesketh family having its origins in Lancashire. However, these were subsequently withdrawn from the university. In 2010 the trustees of the 2nd Baron's will trust sold some of his books, manuscripts and letters at Sotheby's.

== Legacy ==
- Easton, Pennsylvania, a United States city in the Lehigh Valley, is named for Easton Neston house, and the county in which it is located, Northampton County, Pennsylvania, is named for Northamptonshire.

== Sources ==
- Nigel Nicolson 1965. Great Houses of Britain George Weidenfeld and Nicolson Ltd.
- Mark Girouard 1978. Life in the English Country House Yale University
- Kerry Downes 1979. Hawksmoor Thames and Hudson, London
- The Country House Revealed, BBC Publications, chapter 3, Easton Neston, 13 June 2011
