= William Fermor, 1st Baron Leominster =

English politician and peer

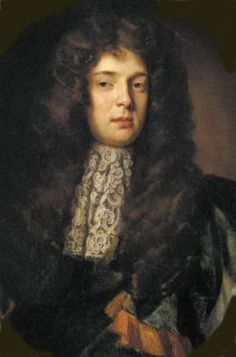
- William Fermor, 1st Baron Leominster, depicted in a 1700 portrait by Godfrey Kneller

Personal details
- Born: 3 August 1648
- Died: 7 December 1711 (aged 63)
- Occupation: Politician
- Known for: Construction of Easton Neston

Arms of Fermor: Argent, a fess sable between three lion's heads erased gules

William Fermor, 1st Baron Leominster (alias Lempster) (3 August 1648 – 7 December 1711), styled Sir William Fermor, 2nd Baronet from 1661 to 1692, was an English politician and peer.

== Biography ==
Fermor was the second but eldest surviving son of Sir William Fermor, 1st Baronet (1621-1661) (alias Farmer), of Easton Neston, Northamptonshire, by his wife Mary Perry, widow of Henry Noel, second son of Edward Noel, 2nd Viscount Campden and a daughter of Hugh Perry of London.

Fermor was educated at Magdalen College, Oxford. He succeeded as second baronet in 1661, was elected a Member of Parliament for Northampton in 1671 and again in 1679.

He was elevated to the peerage on 12 April 1692, as Baron Leominster (alias Lempster) of Leominster, Herefordshire.

== Easton Neston ==
Leominster re-built the mansion house at Easton Neston and planned the gardens and plantations, the wings being to the design of Sir Christopher Wren with the house completed 20 years later in 1702 to the design of Nicholas Hawksmoor. He adorned the whole with part of the Arundel marbles which he had purchased and which his son attempted to restore with the assistance of the Italian sculptor Giovanni Battista Guelfi, a scholar of Camillo Rusconi. The collection was afterwards greatly neglected.

Horace Walpole wrote the following to George Montagu on 20 May 1736, "Coming back, we saw Easton Neston, where in an old greenhouse is a wonderful fine statue of Tully haranguing a numerous assembly of decayed emperors, vestal virgins with new noses, Colossus's, Venus's, headless carcases, and carcaseless heads, pieces of tombs, and hieroglyphics." The marbles were presented in 1755 to the University of Oxford by Henrietta Louisa, Countess of Pomfret. A description of Easton Neston and its art treasures is included in the Catalogue of the Duke of Buckingham's Pictures.

== Marriage and issue ==
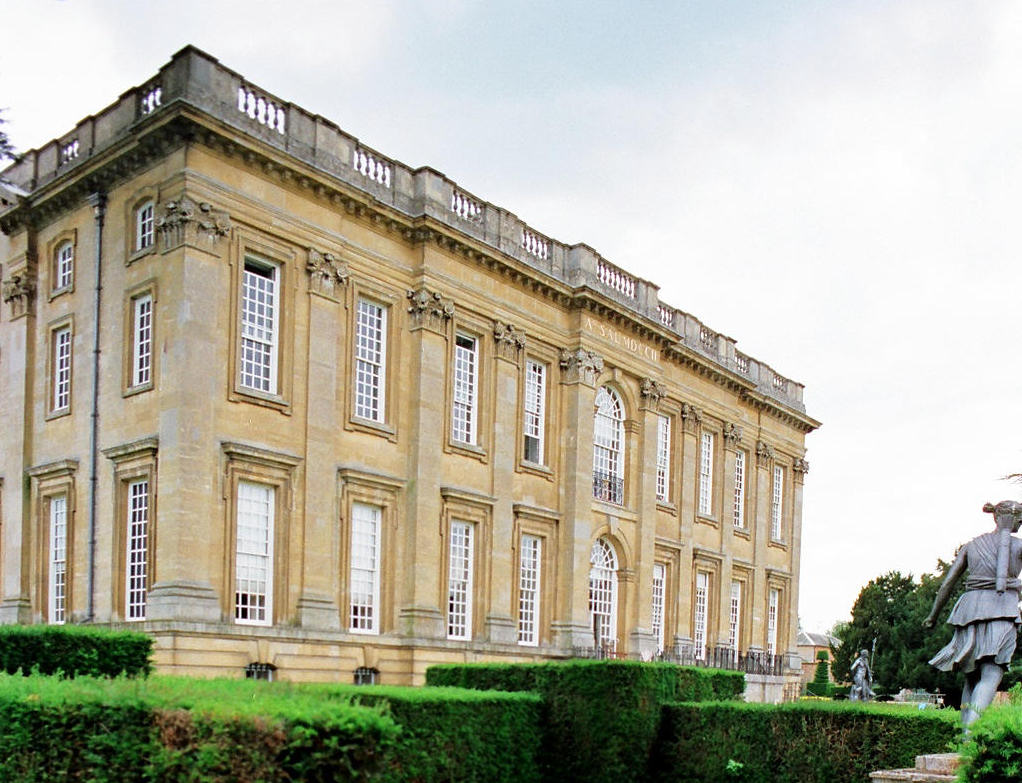
Easton Neston house in Northamptonshire

Fermor married three times:

- Firstly, to Jane Barker, a daughter of Andrew Barker of Fairford, Gloucestershire. Andrew Barker was of the ancient Barker (alias Coverall) family of Coverall Castle and Hopton Castle both in Shropshire, and had acquired the manor of Fairford in about 1660. By Jane Barker he had a daughter:
  - Elizabeth Fermor (d. March 1705), who died unmarried. She spent the large sum of £200 in protecting the magnificent 1490s Fairford stained glass windows in Fairford Church.
- Secondly, he married Catherine Poulett, a daughter of John Poulett, 3rd Baron Poulett, by whom he a daughter:
  - Mary Fermor, who married Sir John Wodehouse, 4th Baronet, of Kimberley, Norfolk.
- Thirdly, he married Lady Sophia Osborne (1661–1746), widow of Donough, Lord Ibrackan (grandson and heir of Henry O'Brien, 7th Earl of Thomond), and daughter of Thomas Osborne, 1st Duke of Leeds by his wife Lady Bridget Bertie, a daughter of Montagu Bertie, 2nd Earl of Lindsey. By Sophia he had five children including:
  - Thomas Fermor, 1st Earl of Pomfret, only son and heir.
  - Matilda Fermor, who married Edward Conyers, MP, of Copt Hall.

== Death and succession ==
Fermor died on 7 December 1711, and was succeeded by his only son, Thomas Fermor, who was created Earl of Pomfret (i.e. Pontefract, Yorkshire) on 27 December 1721.

Parliament of the United Kingdom
Preceded by Hon. Christopher Hatton; Sir Henry Yelverton, Bt	Member of Parliament for Northampton; 1670–1679; With: Lord Ibrackan 1670–1678; Hon. Ralph Montagu 1678; Sir Hugh Cholmeley, Bt 1679	Succeeded by William Langham; Hon. Ralph Montagu
Peerage of England
New creation	Baron Leominster; 1692–1711	Succeeded by Thomas Fermor
Baronetage of England
Preceded by William Fermor	Baronet (of Easton Neston); 1661–1711	Succeeded by Thomas Fermor
