= Hesketh (surname) =

Hesketh is a surname, and may refer to:

- Alexander Fermor-Hesketh, 3rd Baron Hesketh (born 1950), British politician
- Allan Hesketh (1899–1973), British Royal Air Force officer
- Chris Hesketh (1944–2017), English rugby league footballer
- George Hesketh (died 1954), English rugby league footballer
- Frederick Fermor-Hesketh, 2nd Baron Hesketh (1916–1955), British peer and soldier
- Harriett Hesketh (1733–1807), English letter writer
- Hesketh Hesketh-Prichard (1876–1922), English adventurer, writer and marksman
- Huan Hesketh, Catholic Bishop of Sodor and Man in the 16th century
- Iz Hesketh (born 1997), British actress and drag performer
- Jake Hesketh (born 1996), English footballer
- Janet Hesketh (1934–2018), New Zealand women's rights activist
- Joe Hesketh (born 1959), American baseball pitcher
- Karne Hesketh (born 1985), New Zealand-born Japanese rugby union player
- Kenneth Hesketh (born 1968), British composer
- Kit Hesketh-Harvey (1957–2023), British musician, composer and screenwriter
- Lloyd Hesketh Bamford-Hesketh (1788–1861), Welsh landowner
- Barrie and Marianne Hesketh, duo, founders of the Mull Little Theatre
- Owen Hesketh (born 2002), Welsh footballer
- Philip Hesketh (born 1964), British Anglican priest and Dean of Rochester
- Phoebe Hesketh (1909–2005), English poet
- Richard Hesketh (born 1988), English medical doctor and cricketer
- Robert Hesketh (1569–1620), English politician
- Roger Fleetwood-Hesketh (1902–1987), British politician
- Ron Hesketh (born 1947), British Anglican priest
- Roy Hesketh (1915–1944), South African racing driver and South African Air Force pilot
- Sean Hesketh (born 1986), English rugby league footballer
- Sophia Rabe-Hesketh, British statistician
- Steve Hesketh (born 1988), Australian soccer player
- Thomas Hesketh (1548–1605), English politician
- Thomas George Fermor-Hesketh (1849–1924), British soldier and baronet
- Sir Thomas Fermor-Hesketh, 5th Baronet (1825–1872), English politician
- Thomas Fermor-Hesketh, 1st Baron Hesketh (1881–1944), British peer
- Victoria Hesketh, English musician better known by her stage name Little Boots

== See also ==
- Baron Hesketh: the various barons or lords Hesketh, who lived at Easton Neston in Northamptonshire, England
- Hesketh Racing: the 1970s Formula One racing team, formed by Alexander Hesketh
- Hesketh Motorcycles: the motorcycle brand, formed by Alexander Hesketh
