= Thomas Fermor-Hesketh =

Thomas Fermor-Hesketh may refer to:

- Thomas Fermor-Hesketh, 1st Baron Hesketh, British peer, soldier and politician
- Thomas George Fermor-Hesketh, British baronet and soldier
- Sir Thomas Fermor-Hesketh, 5th Baronet, English politician
