= Dr Sullivan and Mr Gilbert =

Play by Christopher Webber; music by Arthur Sullivan

Dr Sullivan and Mr Gilbert is a play written by Christopher Webber, on commission from Mull Theatre in Scotland, with music by Arthur Sullivan. It is a fantasy retelling of the Gilbert and Sullivan story, in which images and characters from Lewis Carroll's 1865 novel Alice in Wonderland are superimposed onto familiar figures from the Savoy Operas.

The play was performed at Mull Theatre throughout July, August and September 1993. It was revived in 1998 at Glasgow Citizens' Theatre and then toured throughout Scotland.

The play was published in 1999 by Couthurst Press (ISBN 1-902819-00-4).
