= V1000 =

V1000 may refer to:

- Vickers V-1000, a jet-powered cargo aircraft
- Fakel V-1000, a Fakel-designed experimental Soviet ABM of Type "A"
- Bandini 1000 V, a 1970 race car prototype
- Hesketh V1000, a British motorcycle
- Britten V1000, a New Zealand motorcycle
- an anti-riot armored vehicle Bravia Chaimite with water cannon
