= Christian Mary McEwen =

British politician, journalist and educationist (1929–2006)

The Right Honourable The Lady Hesketh OBE, DL

High Sheriff of Northamptonshire
- In office 1981–1981
- Preceded by: Robert Henry Nevile Dashwood
- Succeeded by: Hugh Welby Guinness de Capell Brook

Personal details
- Born: Christian Mary McEwen; 17 July 1929 Marchmont House, Greenlaw, Berwickshire, Scotland
- Died: 7 April 2006 (aged 76) London, England
- Party: Conservative
- Spouse: Frederick Fermor-Hesketh, 2nd Baron Hesketh (m. 1949; died 1955)
- Children: 4, including Alexander
- Parent(s): Sir John McEwen, 1st Baronet; Brigid Mary Lindley
- Relatives: Rory McEwen (brother)
- Education: St Mary's School, Ascot
- Alma mater: King's College London

Christian Mary McEwen, Lady Hesketh, OBE, DL (17 July 1929 – 7 April 2006) was a British politician, journalist and educationist.

== Early years ==
She was born on 17 July 1929 at Marchmont House in Greenlaw, Berwickshire, Scotland. She was the only daughter of Captain Sir John Helias Finnie McEwen, MP, and his wife, Brigid Mary (née Lindley). Her brother was Rory McEwen (1932–1982), the artist. She was brought up a Roman Catholic and educated at St Mary's School, Ascot.

== Public service ==
From 1952 to 1983, she was county organiser for the WRVS, and she was a member of the Arts Council from 1960 to 1963. She wrote several works of history and obtained a PhD from King's College London with a thesis published in 1999, The Political Opposition to the Government of Charles I in Scotland. She was a part-time journalist, including rugby correspondent of The Spectator for a while.

In 1981, Lady Hesketh was appointed a Deputy Lieutenant for the county of Northamptonshire (as her husband had been), and she also served as High Sheriff of Northamptonshire in 1981. She was awarded the OBE in 1984.

Lady Hesketh was a chairman of Daventry Conservative Association. She became a County Councillor for Northamptonshire (from 1989 to 1993) and Daventry District Councillor, with a special interest in education. She was chairman of the Governors of the Sponne School, Towcester.

== Personal life ==
On 22 November 1949, she married Frederick Fermor-Hesketh, 2nd Baron Hesketh (1916–1955). Lord Hesketh was the son of Thomas Fermor-Hesketh, 1st Baron Hesketh and the former Florence Louise Breckinridge (a granddaughter of the former American Vice President John C. Breckinridge). They had three sons (a fourth son was stillborn soon after her husband's death.):

- Alexander Fermor-Hesketh, 3rd Baron Hesketh (b. 1950), who married Hon. Claire Georgina Watson, a daughter of Rupert Watson, 3rd Baron Manton.
- Robert Fermor-Hesketh (1951–1997), who was killed in a car accident
- John Fermor-Hesketh (1953–2008)

After her husband's early death, which left her a widow at the age of 25 with three young sons, she took charge of the family house and estate of Easton Neston near Towcester, Northamptonshire. She had two serious motoring accidents, both on the M1 Motorway; in the second of these, in 1972, she lost an eye.

Following her death in 2006, a number of her jewels were auctioned off, including a diamond floral tiara and an aquamarine and diamond tiara. She was survived by her sons Alexander (the 3rd Lord Hesketh) and John.

Honorary titles
Preceded by Robert Dashwood	High Sheriff of Northamptonshire; 1981	Succeeded by Hugh Brook
