= Hesketh Motorcycles =

British motorcycle manufacturer

- Industry: Motorcycle manufacture
- Founded: 1982
- Founder: Alexander Fermor-Hesketh, 3rd Baron Hesketh
- Successor: Broom Engineering; Hesketh Motorcycles 2013 Limited
- Headquarters: Redhill, United Kingdom
- Area served: Global
- Key people: Lord Hesketh (owner); Mick Broom (owner); Paul Sleeman (current owner)
- Products: Hesketh V1000; Hesketh Vampire; Hesketh 24

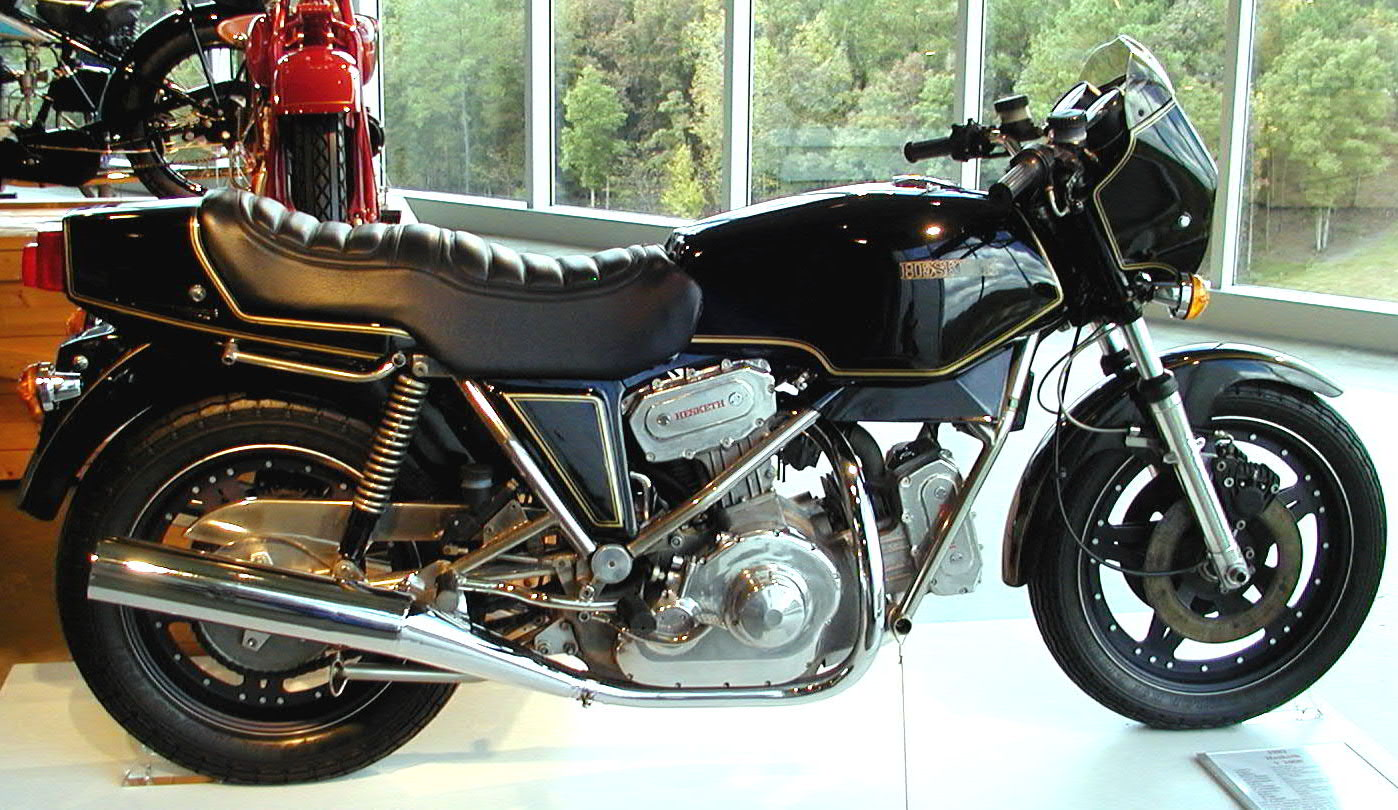
1982 Hesketh V1000 with Astralite wheels

Hesketh Motorcycles is a British motorcycle manufacturer, initially based in Daventry and Easton Neston, Northamptonshire, England.

The company was formed by Alexander, 3rd Lord Hesketh, to develop a prototype in 1980. After two variations of his business had rapidly failed, from 1984 onwards the marque was maintained and improved by Broom Engineering based at Turweston Aerodrome, on the Northamptonshire border with Buckinghamshire, England. The most recent incarnation of the marque from 2013 is based in Kingswood, Surrey, England.

== Background ==
The project was inspired by Lord Hesketh, who planned to revive the failing British motorcycle industry and at the time had a background of F1 racing. Lord Hesketh wanted to use the skills and facilities built up in that pursuit to greater effect and production of a quality motorcycle was born.

The Hesketh motorcycle was developed on the Easton Neston estate, with the prototype running in the spring of 1980 using a special Weslake engine. The V-twin V1000 (based loosely on the marketing panache of the Vincent Motorcycle but looking much-like a contemporary Ducati 860GT), offered all sorts of advances; for example, it was the first British bike with four valves per cylinder and twin overhead camshafts (although commonplace in Japanese machines).

After two years of development, the project was announced to the press and partners were sought for the manufacturing. However, none were forthcoming and so Lord Hesketh formed Hesketh Motorcycles plc. In 1982 a modern purpose-built factory was set up to manufacture the Hesketh V1000 motorcycles in Daventry.

However, there were numerous problems. The bikes were heavy, which was made worse by a high riding style and unreliability, with numerous manufacturing problems adding to the problem of overheating the rear cylinder due to lack of air flow. The resultant bad press combined with an underdeveloped bike, lack of cash and a collapsing market meant that after the production of 139 bikes, the company went into receivership.

Cagiva visited the Daventry facility in September 1982, with a view to absorbing the Hesketh into their range of machines. Sales Director Luigi Giacometti reported to Motor Cycle News that they were disappointed to learn that all the components were sourced from outside suppliers, that there were no manufacturing facilities excepting a few trollies, and that the Receiver wanted £150,000 (pounds sterling) for only a pile of papers and drawings.

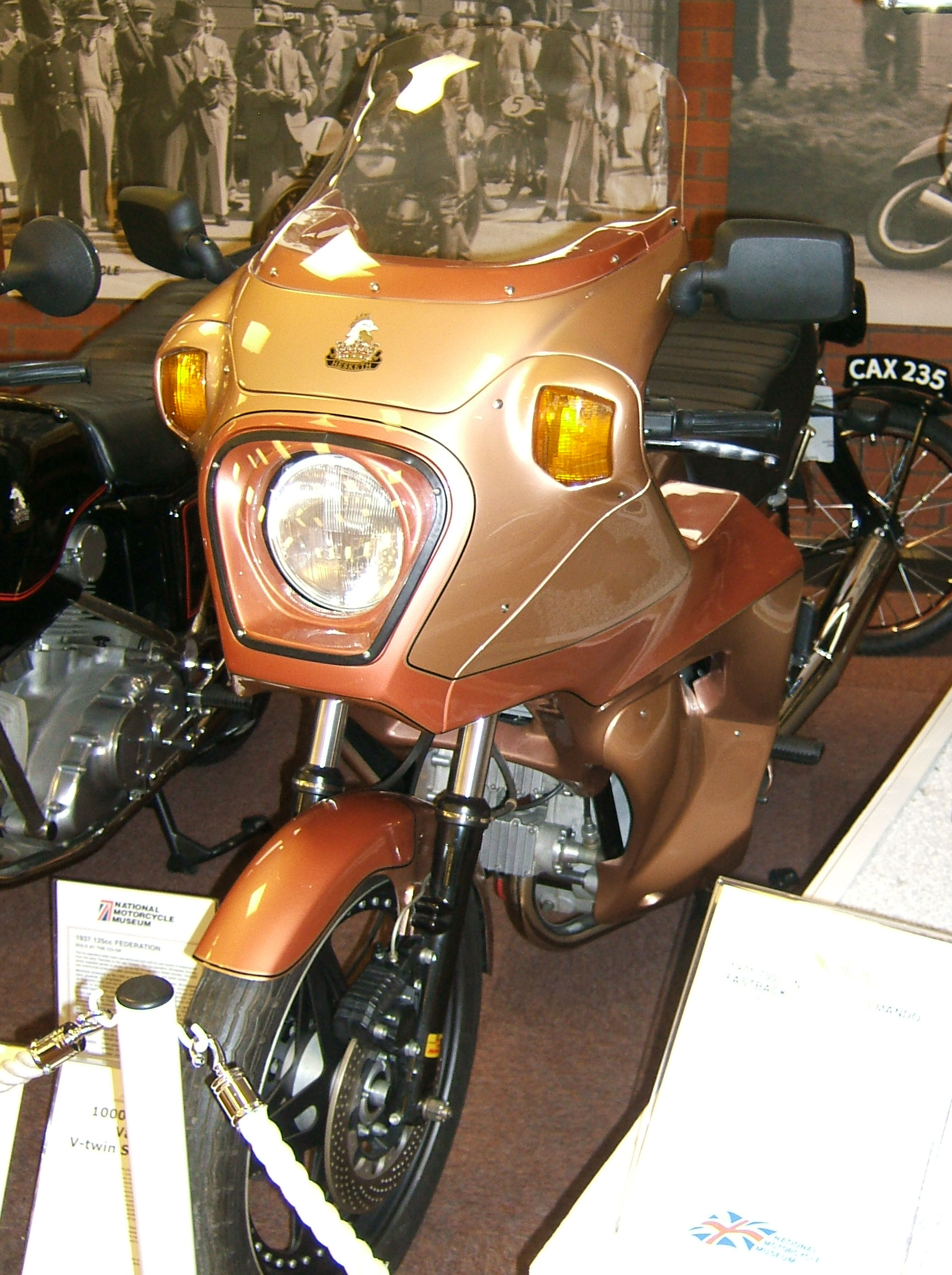
The very rare 1984 Hesketh Vampire

He was sure they could cure the Hesketh mechanical problems, but Cagiva withdrew their interest after Hesketh marketing chief Peter Gaydon appeared in a TV interview, stating he feared a drop in quality and that the marque would end-up as a 'spaghetti special' under Cagiva.

The Triumph Motorcycles co-operative looked at buying the rights to the machine, as they lacked a new model beyond the aged Triumph Bonneville. A V1000 machine even appeared with a Triumph badge on its tank, but Triumph also lacked funding to buy and develop the machine.

In 1983, Lord Hesketh (who had acquired the main rights from the old company's liquidation) formed a new company called Hesleydon Ltd to manufacture a revamped V1000 with a full fairing, called the Vampire. However, although the company had produced a motorcycle with export potential in mind, the Vampire retained too many of the V1000's faults and only 40 were produced before the company closed again in 1984.

=== Crowdfunding ===
When Lord Hesketh's plans were first announced, they were greeted favourably by the British motorcycle press, who regarded them as the beginnings of the rebirth of the British motorbike industry. A considerable amount of the investment capital was raised from motorcyclist enthusiasts. After the company collapsed, such small investors (who in hindsight seem to have been hopelessly optimistic) lost most of their money, whereas at the liquidation sale Lord Hesketh managed to reacquire most of the manufacturing rights cheaply. This led to a certain amount of bad blood, and Lord Hesketh was suspected of asset-stripping.

== Broom Development Engineering ==
Mick Broom was the development engineer/ test rider as part of the original development team of the Hesketh marque, and was based with the team in the old laundry at Easton Neston. When the original Hesketh Motorcycles plc company went into receivership, Broom was part of a team funded by Lord Hesketh which supported the owners of the original machines, offering maintenance and modifications to the bikes sold. This funded team eventually became Hesleydon Ltd, who obtained the necessary certification to sell overseas and went on to develop the Vampire after requests for a touring version of the V1000.

Combined with the general down turn in motorcycle market, the high cost of the parts and the inability to raise finance to implement volume production assembly methods, Hesleydon ceased trading and Broom continued to support and develop the bike alongside development work for other motorcycle factories and clients Broom Development Engineering.

Based in the same outbuildings where the development of the V1000 had begun, Broom and his team began improvement of the V1000 into a reliable "gentleman's" long distance tourer. This included the resolution of the overheating through increased oil flow to cool the rear cylinder. Broom produced up to 12 motorcycles per annum, additionally developing the Vulcan and Vortan concept machines.

=== Silverstone ===
In 2006, having been forced to leave Easton Neston after its sale by Lord Hesketh to Leon Max, and Max's intention to turn the stable block into a call centre for his Max Store clothing brand, Broom Engineering relocated to Turweston Aerodrome near Silverstone Circuit. However, just before the move, and at the point where most items were in packing crates, the premises were burgled with total value of £40,000 – including irreplaceable records, tools, and bikes. This slowed progress on the intended small scale production at the new location.

== Resuscitation of the brand ==
Under new ownership and management since Mick Broom sold the marque in 2010, Hesketh Motorcycles Ltd plans to establish a British motorcycle company through the production of new models over the years.

In early 2014 Hesketh Motorcycles announced the upcoming release of the Hesketh 24 that would be the first all-new Hesketh model to be produced in some thirty years.

=== Hesketh 24 ===
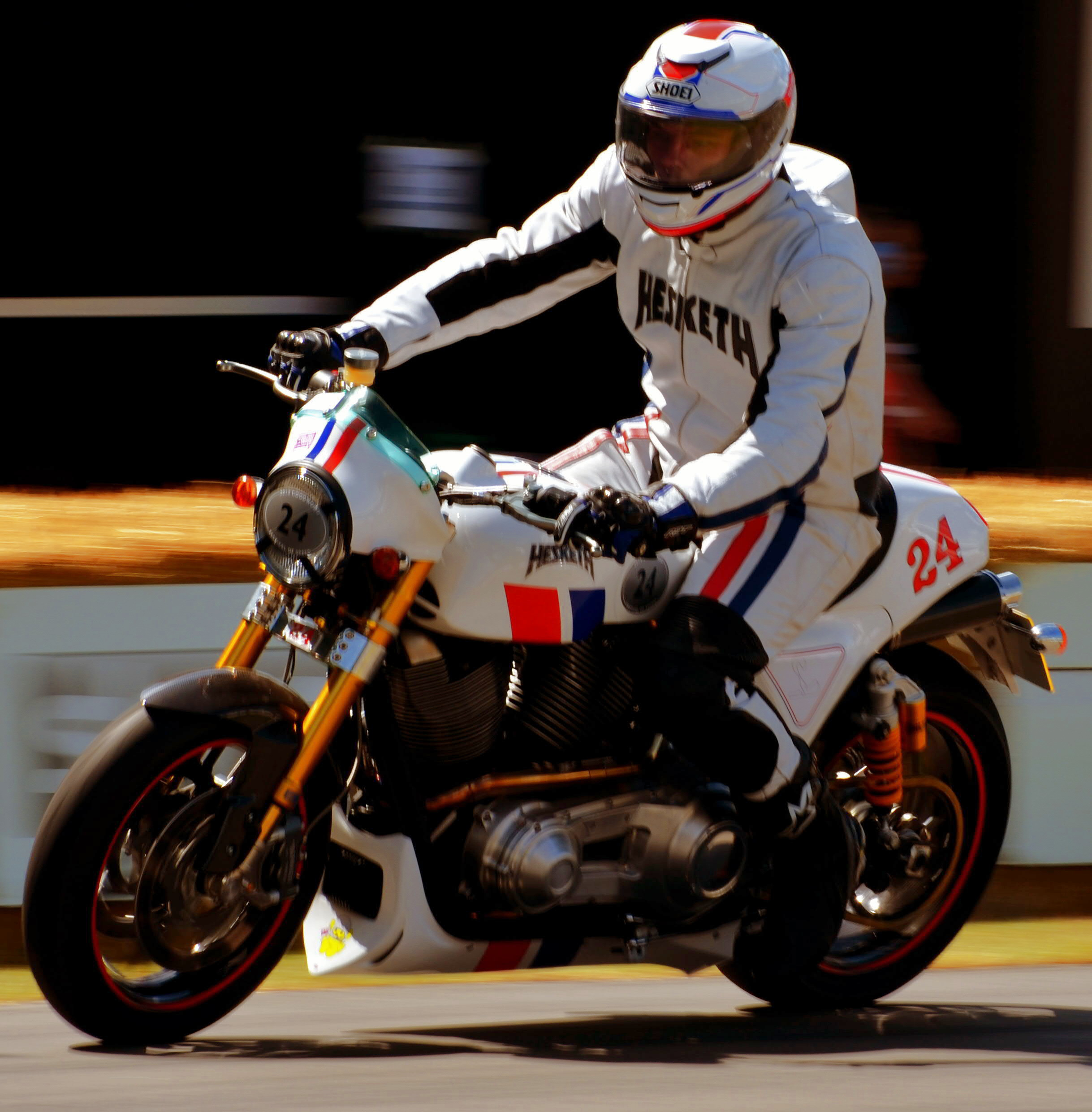
Hesketh works rider demonstrating the pre-production Hesketh 24 at Goodwood Festival of Speed 2014

Designed and developed by Paul Sleeman, Hesketh Motorcycles owner and Chief Engineer, this proposed new machine – named after the number on James Hunt's 1975 F1 car – will be a limited edition with only 24 built and on sale internationally.

This model is powered the American S&S "X-wedge" engine, a high torque 1,917 cc (117 cu in) air-cooled V-twin with a proven powertrain, that was chosen for reliability. The X-wedge is also the engine used for the Morgan three-wheeler.

British tuners Harris Performance Engines will modify the engine to suit the Hesketh 24 buyers' preferences, offering stage engine tuning to produce at least three different power options.

The Hesketh 24 bodywork is in the colours of James Hunt's 1970s Hesketh F1 car with graphics designed and produced by former BSB rider and 2011 British Superbike Champion, Tommy Hill. Each of the limited edition Hesketh 24 models will feature an 18 carat gold plaque on the fuel tank with its unique serial production number.

== Hesketh Models ==
Name	Year	Size	Number Made
V1000	1982	1000 cc	130
Vampire	1983	1000 cc	50
Vortan	1985	1100 cc	1
Vulcan	1990	1200 cc	1*
Kingswood V1000	2012	1000 cc	5
Hesketh 24	2014	1917 cc	24**
Hesketh Sonnet and 124	2017	1000 cc	1

- V1000 - The first Hesketh, a V-twin gentleman's tourer with a nickel-plated Reynolds 531 frame.
- Vampire - A touring based version of the V1000, with fairing and optional panniers.
- Vortan - A bored-out 1100 cc, sports version of the V1000 with highly modified chassis.
- Vulcan - In 1990 a single prototype was built with modifications including a bored-out 1200 cc engine.
- Hesketh 24 - Named after James Hunt's 1975 F1 car, this is a Limited Edition with a 1917 cc S&S engine. Only 24** units are proposed to be built.
