= Broom Development Engineering =

- Company type: Private
- Industry: Motorcycle, Aerospace
- Headquarters: Brackley, Northamptonshire, England
- Key people: Mick Broom, David Broom
- Products: Motorcycles, R&D
- Website: http://www.broom.engineering.btinternet.co.uk/

Broom Development Engineering is a British motorcycle manufacturer, and provides research and development services to the automotive and aerospace industries. Established in 1982 by engineer, Hesketh test rider and motorcycle racer Mick Broom, the company is based at Turweston Airfield near Brackley, Northamptonshire not far from the Silverstone racing circuit and has continued to improve the Hesketh V1000 engine and frame performance as well as updating earlier motorcycles to the latest specification. It produced each year about a dozen new V1000 EN10 motorcycles which were the V1000 with oil cooling improvements including an oil radiator to cool the rear cylinder. It has also produced fifty Hesketh Vampire tourers to customer specifications. Mick Broom put the Hesketh business up for sale in September 2008. The Hesketh motorcycle side of Broom Development Engineering was taken over by Mr Paul Sleeman who relocated the business south of London and intends to continue the improvements to the present models, with back-up and spares to present Hesketh owners and in time introduce new models.

In 2022, Hesketh Motorcycles announced the launch of the Hesketh Heresy, a 450cc single-cylinder model, marking a new direction for the brand.

== Model range ==
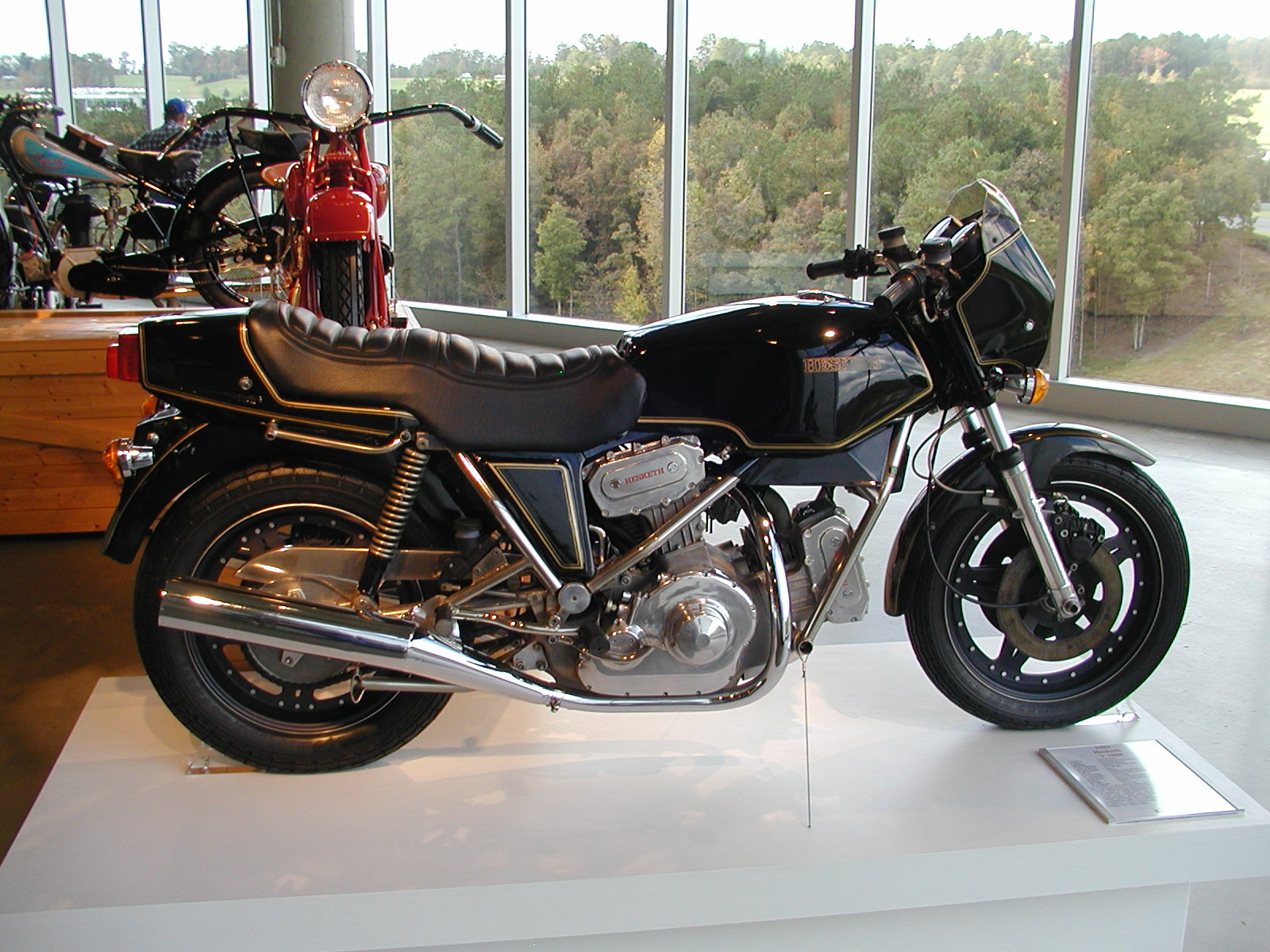
1982 Hesketh V1000

Model	Production	Notes
Hesketh Vulcan	2004 onwards	Latest evolution of the V1000 model with restyled body, more options and larger capacity hand built to order
Hesketh V1000	200 (1982 to 2010)	EN10 updates of original V1000
Hesketh Vampire	50 (1984 to present)	Touring version of V1000
Hesketh Vortan	1 (1986)	Single seat European styled with preproduction V1200 engine
