= Christopher Webber =

English musicologist

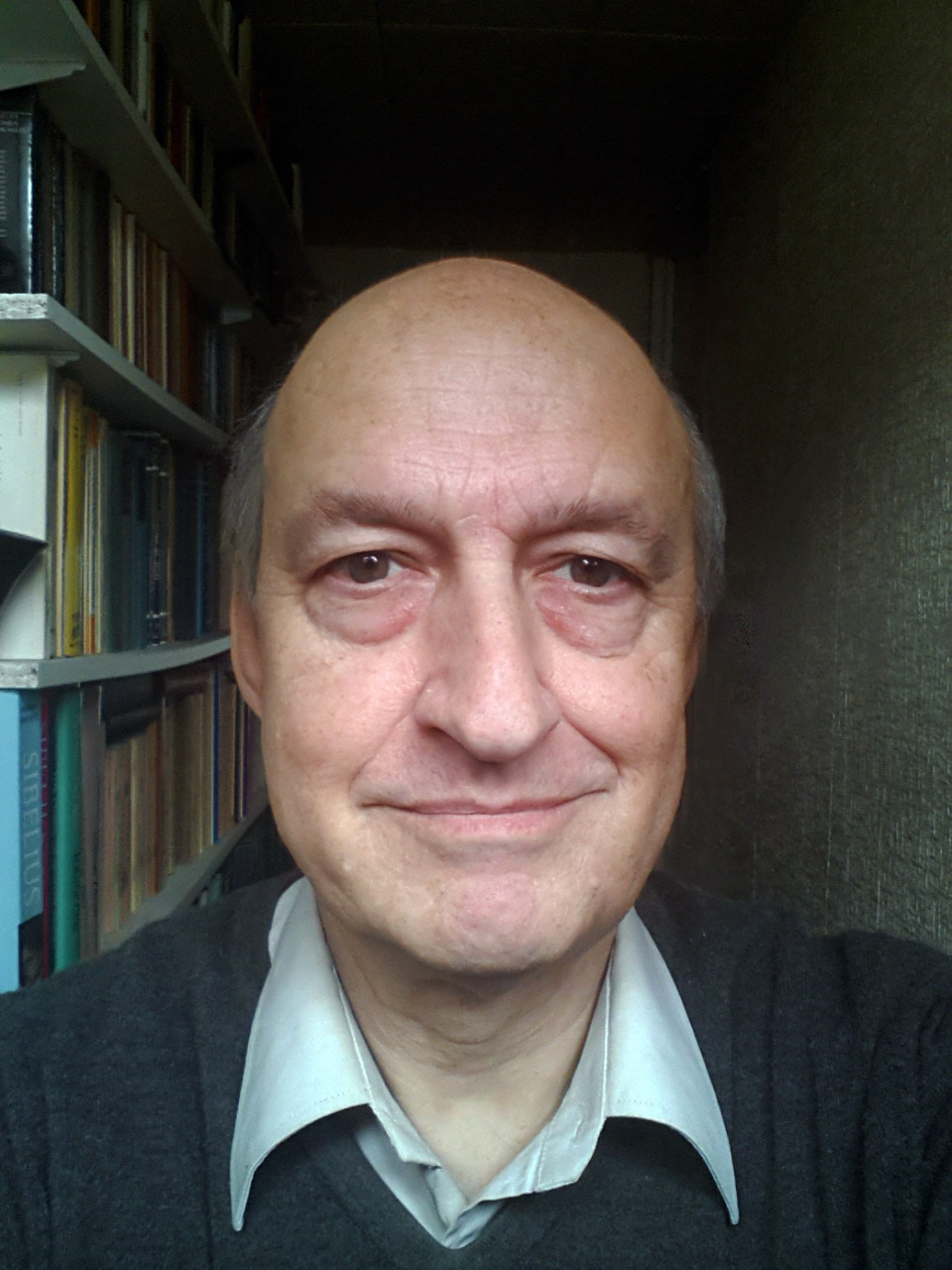
Christopher Webber

Christopher Webber (born 27 May 1953) is an English musicologist, dramatist, actor, theatre director and writer.

== Biography ==
Webber was born in Bowdon, Cheshire (now Greater Manchester) and educated at The Manchester Grammar School and the University of Kent at Canterbury. Starting his professional career with theatre directing work, for companies such as Orpheus Opera (of which he was Artistic Director 1980–87), Kent Opera, the new D'Oyly Carte Opera Company in Britain and the USA, and various other English companies, he soon broadened his portfolio to include musical journalism, as Opera and Classical Music Editor for Richard Branson's Event Magazine, as well as Music and Musicians Magazine.

As a writer, his early work included Bluff Your Way at the Races (Ravette) as well as many opera translations into English. Play commissions soon followed, beginning with a new English version of Sophocles's Philoctetes written for Offstage Downstairs. Later successes include Tatyana commissioned by Nottingham Playhouse, with Josie Lawrence in the title role, and Beverly Klein as her sister Olga; Dr Sullivan and Mr Gilbert (Mull Theatre, revived at Glasgow Citizens' Theatre and on tour throughout Scotland); and Green Tea, shortlisted for a Guinness Prize.

He is an authority on the Spanish zarzuela, and his book The Zarzuela Companion (Scarecrow Press 2002, Foreword by Plácido Domingo) is a standard English work on the subject. He contributed the chapter on zarzuela to The Cambridge Companion to Operetta (Cambridge University Press 2019); has written on Hispanic and Portuguese Music for The Oxford Companion to Music, Opera Magazine, Opera Now, Royal Opera Covent Garden and many other publications; has provided programme notes and translations for many concert and festival organisations including the New York Philharmonic Orchestra, Wexford Festival and Edinburgh Festival; and been Visiting Lecturer on the subject at various academic institutions, including the University of Tübingen and University of Valencia. For Oxford University Press's Bibliographies project, he wrote and curates the article on zarzuela (2016). In December 2022, he was appointed Editor (with Enrique Mejías García) of the Cambridge History of Spanish Opera and Music Theatre.

He is also an advisory editor and contributor to the Oxford Dictionary of National Biography, having written over fifty entries including those on his Manchester Grammar School contemporary Steven Pimlott, Sir Jimmy Young and Joyce Hatto. Webber has since been featured on British TV's Channel 4 and BBC Radio 4, in documentaries about Hatto, "the fraudster pianist".

As an actor, he has worked in England's West End and Repertory Theatre, creating the role of Owl in the first stage version of Winnie-the-Pooh (London Royalty Theatre and national tour) and taking part in world and/or international premières of plays by Alan Ayckbourn and Alan Bennett amongst others. He has also been an exponent in the field of corporate and medical professional actor-based roleplaying, especially noted for his work on development of feedback techniques, including his formulation of Advocate Feedback.

== Plays ==
- Philoctetes (1987, based on Sophocles)
- Green Isle (1989)
- Love and Politics (1990, based on Schiller's Kabale und Liebe)
- Tatyana (1990)
- Birth of an Opera, Death of a Composer (1990)
- Green Tea (1993, rev. 2000) (Couthurst Press 2000, ISBN 1-902819-01-2)
- Dr Sullivan and Mr Gilbert (1993) (Couthurst Press 2001, ISBN 1-902819-00-4)
- Mozart and Salieri (1993, after Pushkin)
- A Flower and a Kiss (commissioned Welsh National Opera, 1995)
- The Girl with the Roses (1999, after Pablo Sorozábal's La del manojo de rosas)
- The Stronger (2010, zarzuela after Strindberg, with Derek Barnes composer)

== Books ==
- Bluff Your Way in Opera (Ravette, 1989, with Peter Gammond)
- Bluff Your Way At the Races (Ravette, 1990)
- The Zarzuela Companion (Scarecrow Press Inc., 2002) Lib. Cong. 2002110168 / ISBN 0-8108-4447-8
- The Oxford Companion to Music (OUP, 2002 ed. Alison Latham; major contributor)
- Zarzuela! (UME, from 2001 [4 vols.] ed.)
- 'The alcalde, the negro and la bribona: género ínfimo zarzuela, 1900–1910' in De la zarzuela al cine. Los medios de comunicación populares y su traducción de la voz marginal (München, Martin Meidenbauer, 2010 ed. Max Doppelbauer and Kathrin Sartingen) ISBN 978-3-89975-208-3
- 'Chapí, "el gran camaleón"' in Ruperto Chapí: nuevas perspectivas Vol.1 (Valencia, Institut de la Música, 2012 ed. Víctor Sánchez Sánchez et al.) ISBN 978-84-482-5798-9
- 'Under the Influence: Pablo Luna and opereta española' in El teatro de arte (Madrid, Fundación Guerrero, 2016 ed. Alberto González Lapuente and Alberto Honrado Pinilla) ISBN 978-84-617-4100-7
- 'Zarzuela', Chapter 8 in So You Want to Sing Light Opera (Washington DC, Rowman & Littlefield, 2017 ed. Linda Lister) ISBN 9781442269385
- 'Spain and Zarzuela' in The Cambridge Companion to Operetta (Cambridge, University Press, 2019 ed. Anastasia Belina and Derek B. Scott) ISBN 9781107182165
- '¿Fruta podrida? Nuevas perspectivas sobre la zarzuela ínfima en Madrid (1900-1912)' in Música, escena y cine (1896-1978): diálogos y sinergias en la España del siglo XX (Hispanic Music Series 5, Universidad de Oviedo, 2021 ed. Miriam Perandones and María Encina Cortizo) ISBN 9788418482229
