= Hesketh =

Hesketh may refer to:

- Hesketh, Alberta, a Canadian hamlet
- Hesketh Arms, a former public house in Greater Manchester, England
- Hesketh Bank, a small agricultural village in West Lancashire, England
- Hesketh Racing, English racing team and constructors

== People with the surname ==
- Hesketh (surname)
