= Alexander Fermor-Hesketh, 3rd Baron Hesketh =

British peer and UK Independence Party politician

The Right Honourable The Lord Hesketh KBE PC

Chief Whip of the House of Lords Captain of the Honourable Corps of Gentlemen-at-Arms
- In office 22 May 1991 – 16 September 1993
- Prime Minister: John Major
- Preceded by: Lord Denham
- Succeeded by: Viscount Ullswater

Minister of State for Industry
- In office 2 November 1990 – 21 May 1991
- Prime Minister: Margaret Thatcher; John Major
- Preceded by: Douglas Hogg
- Succeeded by: post vacant

Parliamentary under-secretary of State for Environment
- In office 31 January 1989 – 2 November 1990
- Prime Minister: Margaret Thatcher
- Preceded by: Virginia Bottomley
- Succeeded by: David Heathcoat-Amory

Member of the House of Lords Lord Temporal
- In office 28 October 1971 – 11 November 1999 hereditary peer
- Preceded by: Frederick Fermor-Hesketh
- Succeeded by: seat abolished House of Lords Act 1999

Personal details
- Born: Thomas Alexander Fermor-Hesketh; 28 October 1950 (age 76)
- Party: UKIP
- Other political affiliations: Conservative (until 2011)
- Spouse: Hon Claire Watson (after 1977)
- Children: 3
- Education: Ampleforth College

Thomas Alexander Fermor-Hesketh, 3rd Baron Hesketh (born 28 October 1950), is a British peer and UK Independence Party politician.

== Early life ==
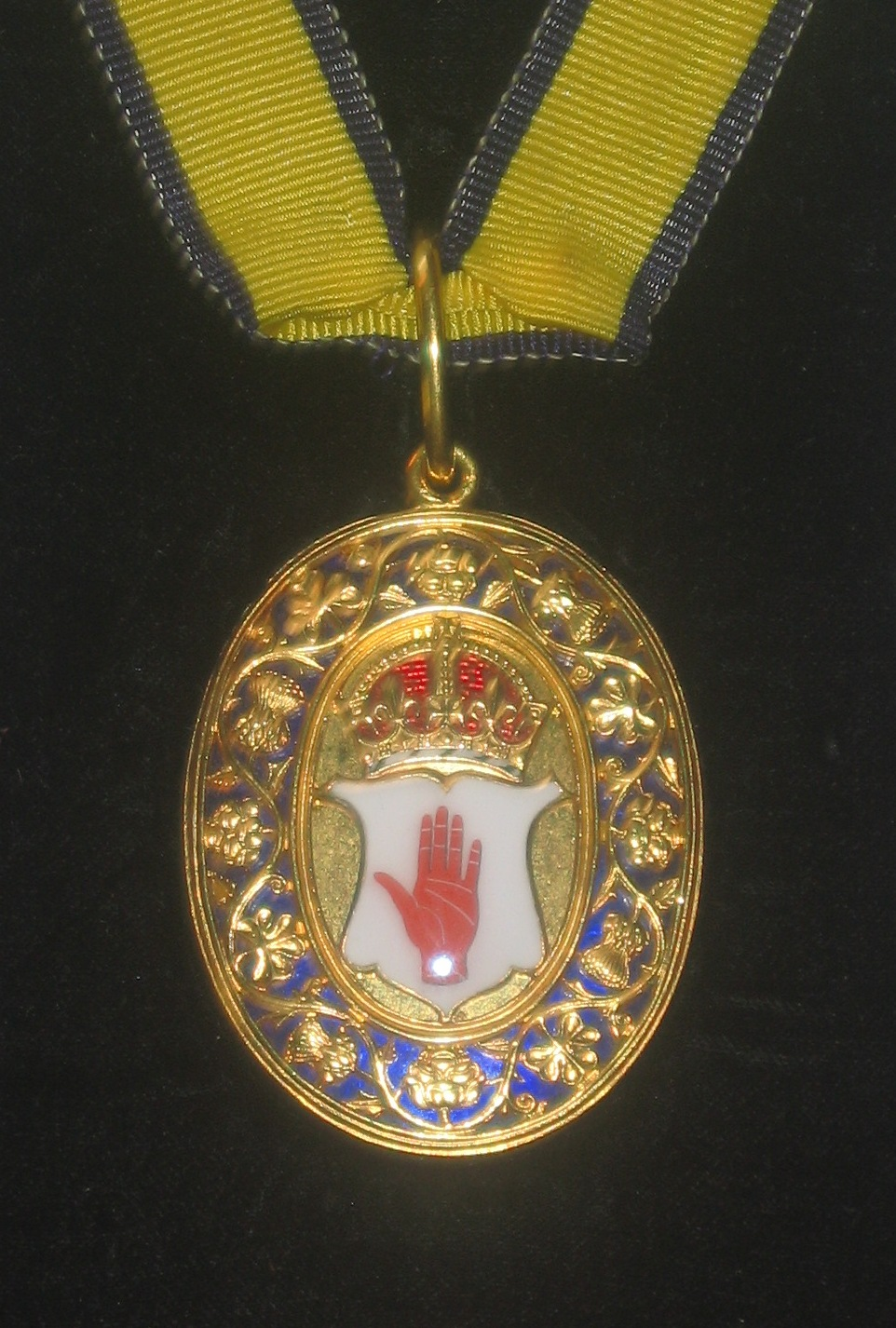
Insignia of Baronet

Hesketh succeeded in the barony (and baronetcy) on 6 October 1955, aged four, when his father, Frederick Fermor-Hesketh, 2nd Baron Hesketh, died aged 39. His mother, Christian Mary McEwen, Dowager Lady Hesketh, served as the High Sheriff of Northamptonshire in 1981.

He was educated at Ampleforth College, Yorkshire. He went on to work for Dean Witter in San Francisco before returning to manage his family's businesses.

== Career ==
Hesketh automatically became a member of the House of Lords but took no active part in politics until he met Prime Minister Margaret Thatcher after the Irish Republican Army's bomb attack on her in Brighton on 12 October 1984. Thatcher visited Easton Neston and in conversation, Hesketh explained that he did not occupy his seat in the House of Lords. He later explained, "Mrs Thatcher asked me if I served on a regular basis in the House, and when I told her no, she said, 'You must. It's your duty, and I expect you to be there.'"

From that point Hesketh worked under Thatcher, whom he described as "the most outstanding person I ever worked with" and held the office of Parliamentary Under-Secretary of State, Department for Environment between 1989 and 1990 and was Minister of State in the Department of Trade and Industry between 1990 and 1991.

On 22 May of that year, he became Captain of the Honourable Corps of Gentlemen at Arms (Government Chief Whip in the House of Lords) under the next prime minister, John Major, a position he kept until 16 September 1993. During his period in office as Chief Whip he helped secure the Local Government Finance Act 1992, which introduced council taxes, and the European Communities (Amendment) Act 1993, which ratified the Maastricht Treaty.

Hesketh lost his seat in the House of Lords in 1999, when the House of Lords Act 1999 removed all but 92 hereditary peers, and he was not one of the 92 who were elected to keep their seats.

In 2003, he became treasurer of the Conservative Party, resigning in 2006 owing to his own financial difficulties, and was formerly a board member of The Conservative Party Foundation.

On 10 October 2011, Hesketh defected to the UK Independence Party, in response to Prime Minister David Cameron ruling out a referendum on Britain's membership of the European Union. During the years 2011/12 Hesketh donated approximately £31,000 to that party.

=== Business ===
Known for his love of motor racing, Hesketh founded Hesketh Racing in 1972, best known for competing in Formula One from 1973 to 1978. The team was famous for its flamboyant and patriotic approach to the sport and for refusing sponsorship. Between 1973 and 1975 the team had some success with the English driver James Hunt, including winning the 1975 Dutch Grand Prix. He was later president of the British Racing Drivers' Club, from 1993 to 2000. Hesketh was portrayed by British actor Christian McKay in the 2013 F1 biographical drama Rush.

Hesketh formed Hesketh Motorcycles plc. In 1982. a modern purpose-built factory was set up to manufacture the Hesketh V1000 motorcycles in Daventry. There were numerous problems. The bikes were heavy, made worse by a high riding style, and unreliable, with numerous manufacturing problems adding to an overheating rear cylinder due to lack of air flow. The resultant bad press combined on top of an under-developed bike, lack of cash and a collapsing market meant that after the production of 139 bikes, the company went into receivership.

The Triumph Motorcycles co-operative looked at buying the rights to the machine, as they lacked a new model beyond the aged Triumph Bonneville. A V1000 machine appeared with a Triumph badge on its tank, but Triumph lacked funding to buy and develop the machine. In 1983, Lord Hesketh formed a new company called Hesleydon Ltd to manufacture a revamped V1000 with a full fairing, called the Vampire. Although the company had produced a motorcycle with export potential in mind, the Vampire retained too many of the V1000's faults and only 40 were produced before the company closed again in 1984.

In 1994, Hesketh helped set up British Mediterranean Airways (BMED). He became chairman of the new airline – a role in which he continued until early 2007, when BMED was purchased for £30 million by UK Airline BMI. He subsequently served as an "independent director" of Air Astana, the national carrier of Kazakhstan.

Hesketh joined the board of Babcock International Group in October 1993, becoming non-executive deputy chairman in April 1996. He was forced to resign in November 2010 after a comment regarding the Royal Navy's new Queen Elizabeth-class aircraft carriers to The Daily Telegraph newspaper, in which he was reported as saying the project would make the country a "laughing stock".

== Personal life ==
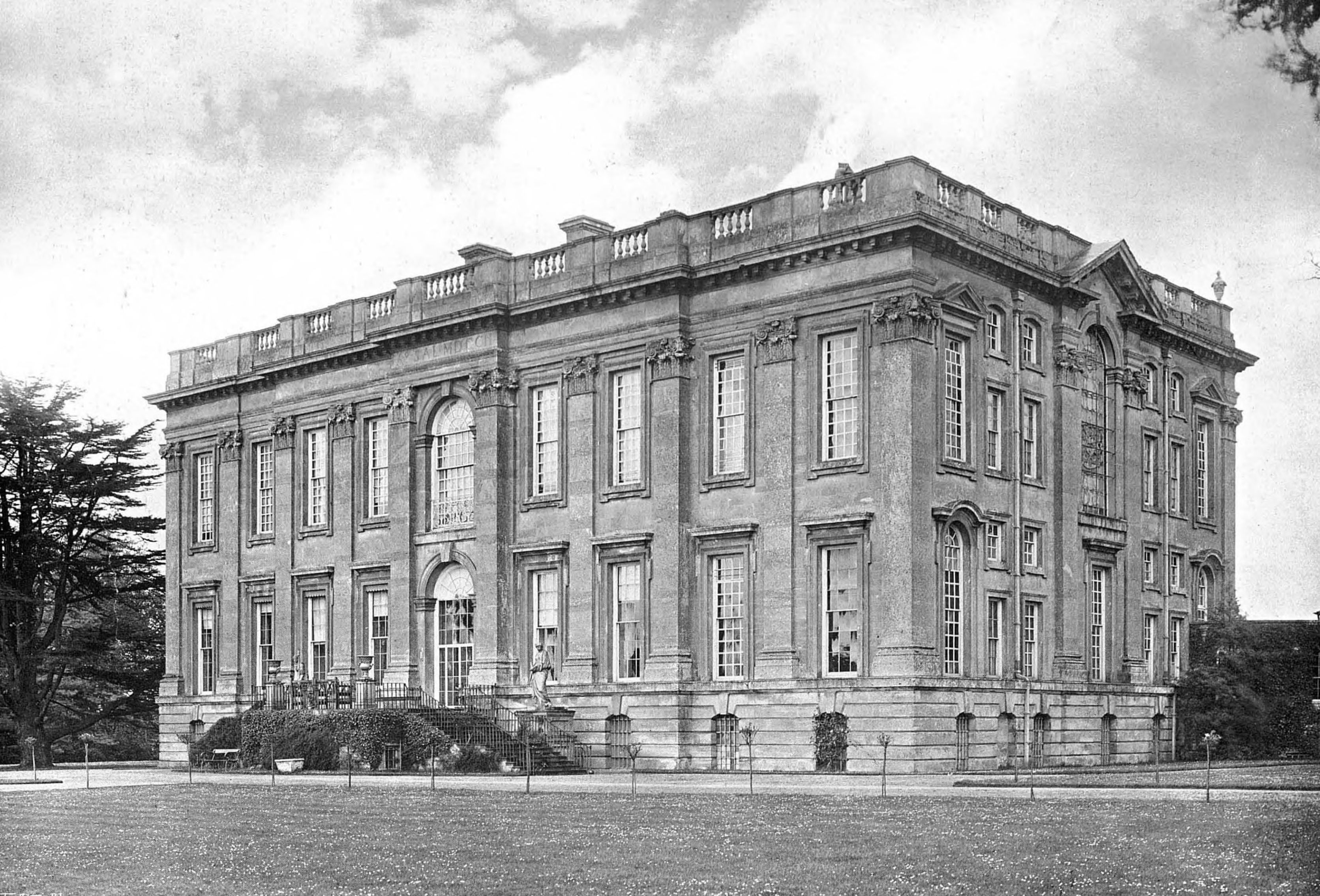
The family seat, Easton Neston, which Lord Hesketh sold in 2006.

On 21 May 1977, Lord Hesketh married Hon. Claire Georgina Watson, a daughter of Rupert Watson, 3rd Baron Manton and the former Mary Elizabeth Hallinan. Together, they are the parents of three children who use the surname Hesketh day-to-day:

- Hon. Flora Mary Fermor-Hesketh (born 1981)
- Hon. Sophia Christian Fermor-Hesketh (born 1984)
- Hon. Frederick Hatton Fermor-Hesketh (born 13 October 1988)

In 2006, Lord Hesketh's financial difficulties forced him to sell the family seat, Easton Neston, at Towcester, Northamptonshire—the only surviving completed house by the English baroque architect Nicholas Hawksmoor—and all furnishings of the house, including the family portraits. He sold off the estate and Gothic village of Hulcote piecemeal.

=== Honours and arms ===
In 1996, Hesketh was appointed a Knight Commander of the Order of the British Empire (KBE).

Coat of arms of Alexander Fermor-Hesketh, 3rd Baron Hesketh
Crest 1st A garb Or banded Azure (Hesketh); 2nd Out of a ducal coronet Or a cock's head Gules combed and wattled Gold. Escutcheon Quarterly 1st & 4th Argent on a bend Sable three garbs Or (Hesketh); 2nd & 3rd Argent a fess Sable between three lions' heads erased Gules (Fermor). Supporters On either side a griffin Or gorged with a collar Gules thereon a fleur-de-lis Gold and charged on the shoulder with a rose also Gules barbed and seeded Proper. Motto Hora E Sempre

== Ancestry ==
Ancestors of Alexander Fermor-Hesketh, 3rd Baron Hesketh

16. Sir Thomas Fermor-Hesketh, 5th Baronet
8. Sir Thomas George Fermor-Hesketh, 7th Baronet
17. Lady Anna Maria Isabella Fermor; (daughter of the 4th Earl of Pomfret)
4. Thomas Fermor-Hesketh, 1st Baron Hesketh
18. William Sharon, U.S. Senator from Nevada
9. Florence Emily Sharon
19. Maria Malloy
2. Frederick Fermor-Hesketh, 2nd Baron Hesketh
20. John C. Breckinridge, 14th Vice President of the United States
10. John Witherspoon Breckinridge
21. Mary Cyrene Burch
5. Florence Louise Breckinridge
22. Lloyd Tevis
11. Louise Tevis
23. Susan Sanders
1. Alexander Fermor-Hesketh, 3rd Baron Hesketh
12. Robert Finnie McEwen, of Marchmont and Bardrochat
6. Sir John McEwen, 1st Baronet
26. R. H. D. Dundas
13. Mary Frances Dundas
3. Christian Mary McEwen
28. Nathaniel Lindley, Baron Lindley
14. Sir Francis Oswald Lindley
29. Sarah Katharine Teale
7. Brigid Mary Lindley
30. Simon Fraser, 13th Lord Lovat
15. Etheldreda Mary Fraser
31. Alice Mary Weld-Blundell

== See also ==
- Hesketh Motorcycles

Political offices
Preceded by The Lord Denham	Chief Whip in the House of Lords; Captain of the Honourable Corps of Gentlemen-at-Arms; 1991–1993	Succeeded by The Viscount Ullswater
Party political offices
Preceded by The Lord Denham	Conservative Chief Whip in the House of Lords; 1991–1993	Succeeded by The Viscount Ullswater
Sporting positions
Preceded by Innes Ireland	President of the British Racing Drivers' Club; 1993–2000	Succeeded by Ken Tyrrell
Peerage of the United Kingdom
Preceded by Frederick Fermor-Hesketh	Baron Hesketh; 1955–present	Incumbent; Heir apparent: Hon. Frederick Fermor-Hesketh
