= Frederick Fermor-Hesketh, 2nd Baron Hesketh =

British peer and soldier (1916–1955)

Frederick Fermor-Hesketh 2nd Baron Hesketh
- Born: 8 April 1916
- Died: 10 June 1955 (aged 39)
- Education: Eton College
- Alma mater: Magdalene College, Cambridge
- Spouse: Christian Mary McEwen (m. 1949)
- Parents: Thomas Fermor-Hesketh (father); Florence Louise Breckinridge (mother)
- Military career
- Allegiance: United Kingdom
- Branch: British Army
- Rank: Major
- Unit: Scots Guards
- Conflicts: World War II

Frederick Fermor-Hesketh, 2nd Baron Hesketh DL (8 April 1916 – 10 June 1955), was a British peer and soldier.

== Background and education ==
Hesketh was the son of Thomas Fermor-Hesketh, 1st Baron Hesketh, and Florence Louise Breckinridge, of Kentucky, daughter of John Witherspoon Breckinridge, and granddaughter of General (CSA) John C. Breckinridge, Vice-President of the United States of America and Secretary of War for the Confederate States of America, in 1909. He was educated from 1926 at Eton and later Magdalene College, Cambridge.

== Military service ==
Hesketh was a major in the Scots Guards. He succeeded in the barony on the death of his father on 20 July 1944. In 1950 he became a Deputy Lieutenant of Northamptonshire.

== Family life ==
On 22 November 1949 he married Christian Mary McEwen (known as Christian Lady Hesketh) (17 July 1929 – 7 April 2006), daughter of Captain Sir John Helias Finnie McEwen and had three children:

- Thomas Alexander (known as Alexander), 3rd Baron Hesketh (b. 28 October 1950)
- Robert (1 November 1951 – 2 February 1997, car accident)
- John (15 March 1953 – 2 November 2008)

Hesketh was a collector of top-end books in the early 1950s. The trustees of his will sold some of his books, manuscripts and letters in 2010 at Sotheby's. The four volumes of John James Audubon's Birds of America were bought by renowned London book dealer Michael Tollemache for a record £7,321,250.

== Arms ==
Coat of arms of Frederick Fermor-Hesketh, 2nd Baron Hesketh
Crest 1st A garb Or banded Azure (Hesketh); 2nd Out of a ducal coronet Or a cock’s head Gules combed and wattled Gold. Escutcheon Quarterly 1st & 4th Argent on a bend Sable three garbs Or (Hesketh); 2nd & 3rd Argent a fess Sable between three lions’ heads erased Gules (Fermor). Supporters On either side a griffin Or gorged with a collar Gules thereon a fleur-de-lis Gold and charged on the shoulder with a rose also Gules barbed and seeded Proper. Motto Hora E Sempre

== See also ==
- Easton Neston
- Easton Neston house

Peerage of the United Kingdom
Preceded by Thomas Fermor-Hesketh	Baron Hesketh; 1944–1955	Succeeded by Thomas Alexander Fermor-Hesketh
