= Mull Little Theatre =

Theatre on the Isle of Mull, Scotland

Coordinates: 56°36′16″N 6°2′20″W

Mull Little Theatre was a theatre on the Isle of Mull in the Inner Scottish Hebrides. Built from the shell of an old byre (cowshed) in 1963 by Barrie and Marianne Hesketh, it began as the Thursday Theatre, an entertainment for the paying guests of the Druimard Guest House. It grew in reputation and officially became "Smallest Professional Theatre in the World" according to the Guinness World Records.

The last performance in the original Little Theatre was given in 2006, and a new Production Centre, capable of housing performances as well as rehearsals and workshops, was opened in July 2008 at Druimfin, just outside Tobermory, the main village on Mull. The organisation merged with An Tobar, the Tobermory arts centre in 2013 and together they now trade as An Tobar and Mull Theatre, a Creative Scotland funded RFO.

== A selection of work presented, 1966 - 1984 ==
- Aleksei Arbuzov - Old World
- J M Barrie - Seven Women; Rosalind; The Twelve Pound Look
- Anton Chekhov - Harmfulness of Tobacco; The Bear; The Packmule; The Proposal; Tatiana Repin (world premier)
- Jean Cocteau - The Human Voice
- Iain Crichton Smith - Phones (the first play he wrote for theatre); A Writer's Notebook; Waiting for the Train
- Jan de Hartog - The Fourposter
- Alfred de Musset - The Door Must Be Either Open or Shut (Il Faut Qu'une Porte Soit Ouverte Ou Fermée)
- Michael Frayn - Chinamen
- Bill Manhoff - The Owl and the Pussycat
- Lorne Macintyre - Verse play
- Ferenc Molnár - The Cab; A Matter of Husbands; A Railway Adventure
- David Pitman - Life and Death of Betty Burke
- Jules Renard - Clean Break; Daily Bread (translated by Rayner Heppenstall, first stage production)
- William Shakespeare - The Tempest; Macbeth
- George Bernard Shaw - Village Wooing; Saint Joan
- August Strindberg - Miss Julie; The Bond; The Stronger
- Oscar Wilde - The Importance of Being Earnest
- Marianne Hesketh - Exile; Mixtymaxty; Loving life (programmes of verse and prose arranged by Marianne); The Gumboil (play)
- Barrie Hesketh - Willy Nilly; Dear Mr Shaw (based on correspondence between Shaw and Margaret Wheeler)
- Barrie & Marianne Hesketh - Ostrich
