= Hesketh V1000 =

- Manufacturer: Hesketh Motorcycles Daventry; Broom Development Engineering Silverstone
- Production: 1980–
- Engine: 992 cc (60.5 cu in) air-cooled 90° V-twin
- Transmission: Five speed constant mesh. Sealed roller O-ring chain
- Brakes: Brembo 310 mm-diameter twin discs (front) with single 270 mm diameter (rear)
- Wheelbase: 1,510 mm (59 in)
- Dimensions: L: 2,235 mm (88.0 in)
- Seat height: 838 mm (33.0 in)
- Fuel capacity: 23 L (5.1 imp gal; 6.1 US gal)

The Hesketh V1000 is a 992 cc (60.5 cu in) OHC V-twin motorcycle with 4 valves per cylinder. It was originally designed and built by Hesketh Motorcycles in Daventry, Northamptonshire. Sales proved disappointing as the motorcycle was expensive and, at 86 bhp, it was somewhat underpowered given its hefty dry weight of 244 kg (538 lb).

Some 149 V1000 motorcycles were produced before the company was wound up in August 1982, after which time Mick Broom continued development and production. In 2010 the assets were taken over by entrepreneur Paul Sleeman, who resurrected the brand with a renewed limited production run.

A Motor Cycle News review said "the engine has a classic simplicity, delivering a modest 86 bhp at just 6500 rpm", adding buyers seeing the Hesketh V1000 as an 80s Vincent twin should "understand it’s a handbuilt, relatively sedate, classic British motorcycle".

== History & development ==
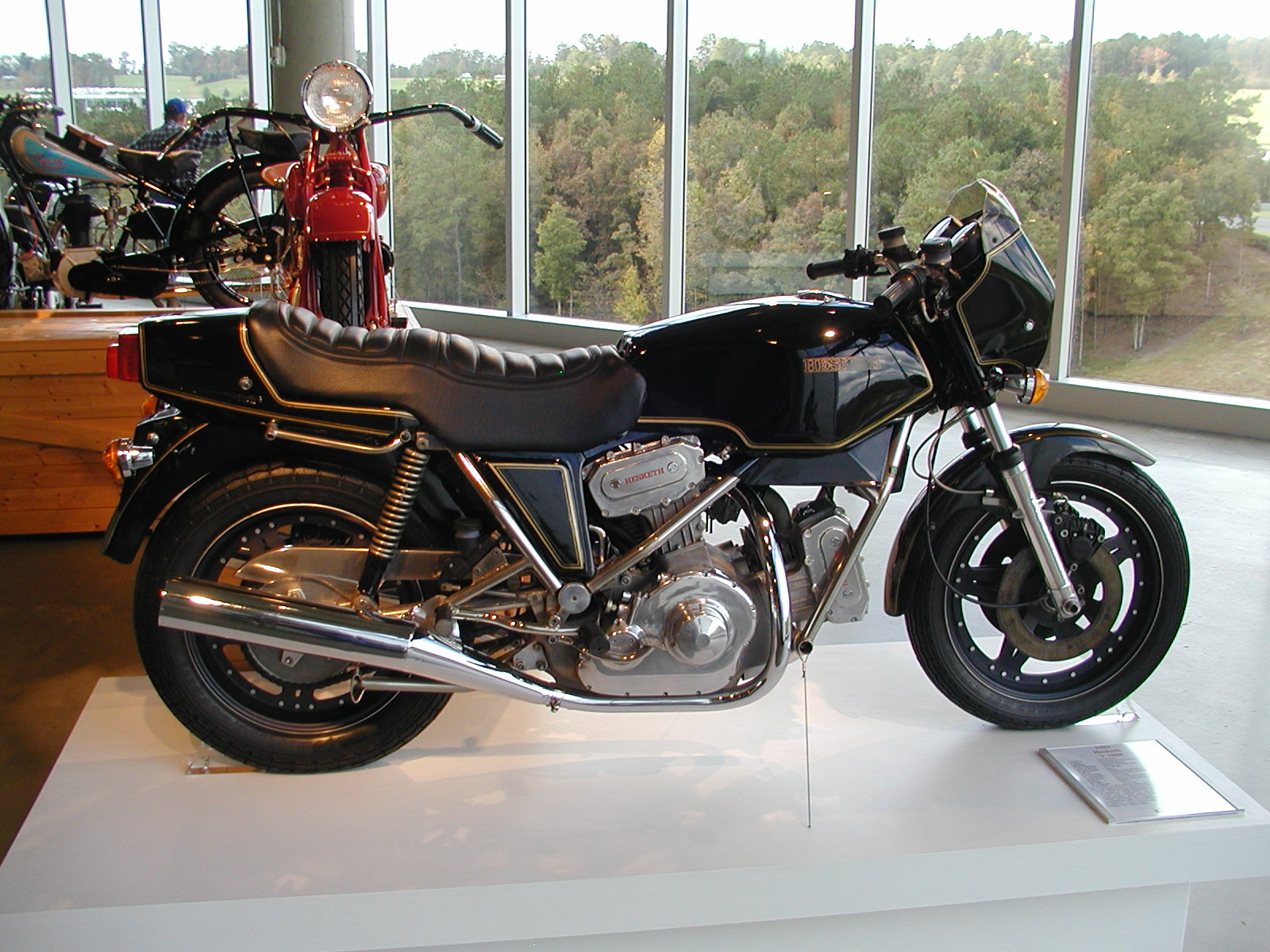
1982 Hesketh V1000

Lord Alexander Hesketh had been planning the production of a new motorcycle since 1974 and began talks with engine specialists Westlake in 1977 about the proposed development of a big V-twin. Hesketh Motorcycles PLC was formed in 1981, a purpose-built factory was set up to manufacture the V1000 in Daventry, and production began in 1981.

Styled by John Mockett, who later went on to design the Triumph Rocket III, the Hesketh V1000 was conceived as a luxury sports machine that could save the British motorcycle industry. The engine was specially developed by Weslake as an air-cooled 90° V-twin with 95 mm (3.7 in) bore and 70 mm (2.8 in) stroke, giving a displacement of 992 cc. With a one piece cast crankshaft and aluminium jackets on iron cylinder barrels and alloy cylinder heads, the V1000 had four valves per cylinder and an overhead camshaft. The V1000 had electronic ignition and a Lucas alternator and starter motor. Lubrication was semi wet-sump and the gearbox was a five-speed constant mesh to a sealed roller chain final drive. Front suspension includes custom yokes machined from solid alloy billets, and conventional rear suspension is provided by twin Marzocchi shocks. The chain drive sprocket was coaxial with the swinging arm pivot, an arrangement to keep the drive chain tension constant, irrespective of the movement of the swinging arm. The alloy wheels, anodised either gold or black, were neither forged nor cast, but were made up from two sheet alloy pressings, riveted together. The frame was available either painted black or nickel-plated. Subsequently, the V1000 received several updates to address early problems, including digital engine management, and modification to suspension, brakes, wheels, engine and gearbox.

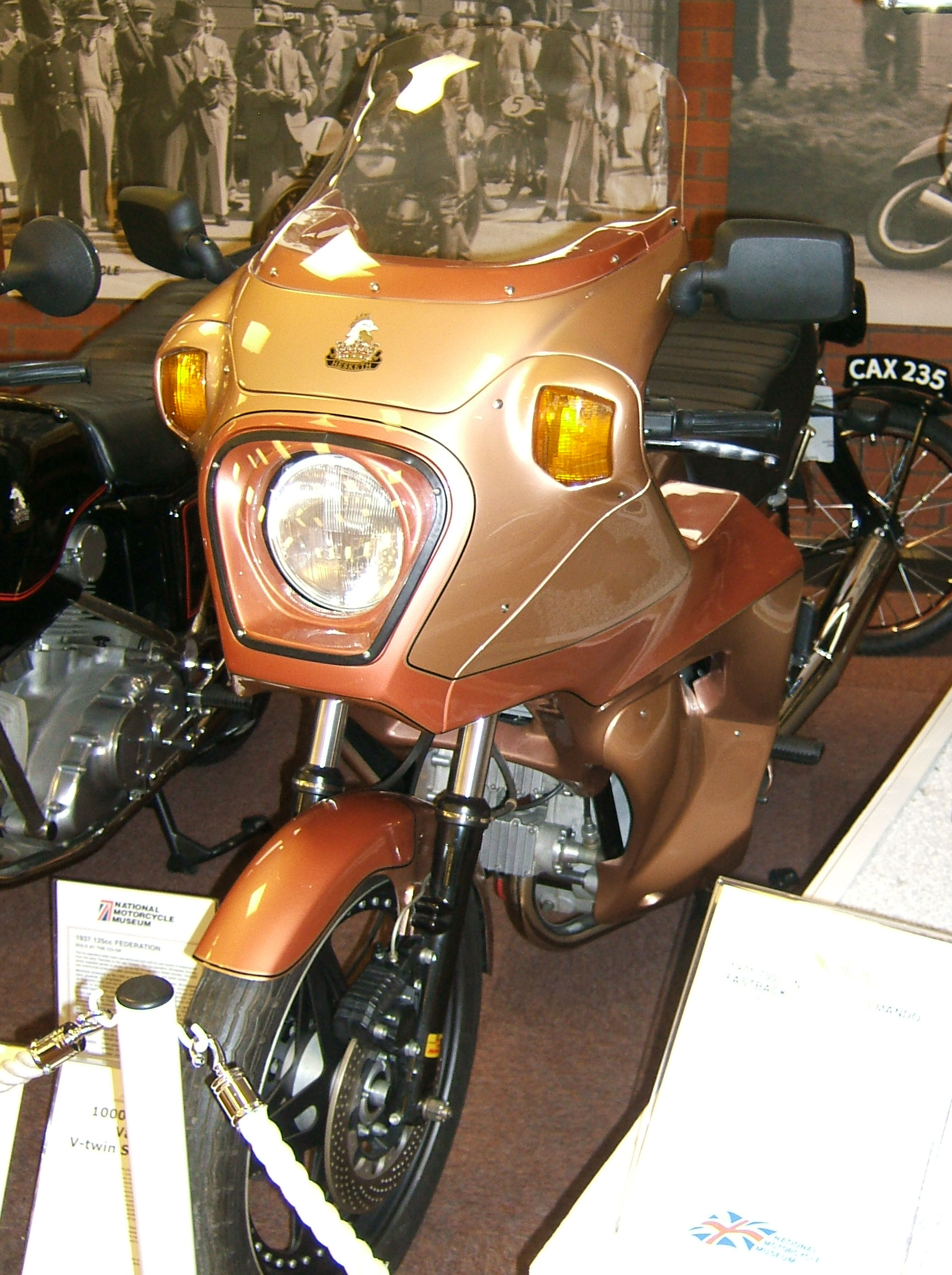
Hesketh Vampire Tourer

After the collapse of the Hesketh Motorcycle company, Lord Hesketh acquired most of the liquidated assets; and in 1983 he formed a new company, Hesleydon Ltd, to manufacture a revamped V1000 with a full fairing. This model, the Hesketh Vampire, was described by reviewers as "heavy and tall". The Vampire went into production prematurely, while still needing development. As well as gearbox problems such as false neutrals, the new fairing restricted turning and the Vampire did not sell well.

== Subsequent events ==
Broom Development Engineering was established in 1982 by Mick Broom, the Hesketh engineer and test rider. The company continued both to improve the V1000 engine and frame performance and to update earlier motorcycles to the latest specification. The company has annually produced about a dozen V1000 EN10 motorcycles, an updated V1000 with oil cooling improvements such as an oil radiator to cool the rear cylinder. Some fifty Hesketh Vampire tourers were built to customer specifications. Amendments to the Vulcan model include radial tyres, more modern suspension and brakes, digital engine management, a bigger engine, and changes to the running gear.

In 2006, after the failure of his business ventures, Lord Hesketh sold the family seat, Easton Neston, at Towcester in Northamptonshire. In September 2008, in a bid to attract much needed investment in the marque, Mick Broom put the Hesketh motorcycle business on the market. In 2010 the Hesketh brand was taken over by entrepreneur Paul Sleeman. In August 2011 Broom, who has built more than 300 Hesketh motorcycles, was badly burned in a petrol fire in a workshop.
