= Turweston Aerodrome =

Airfield in Buckinghamshire, England

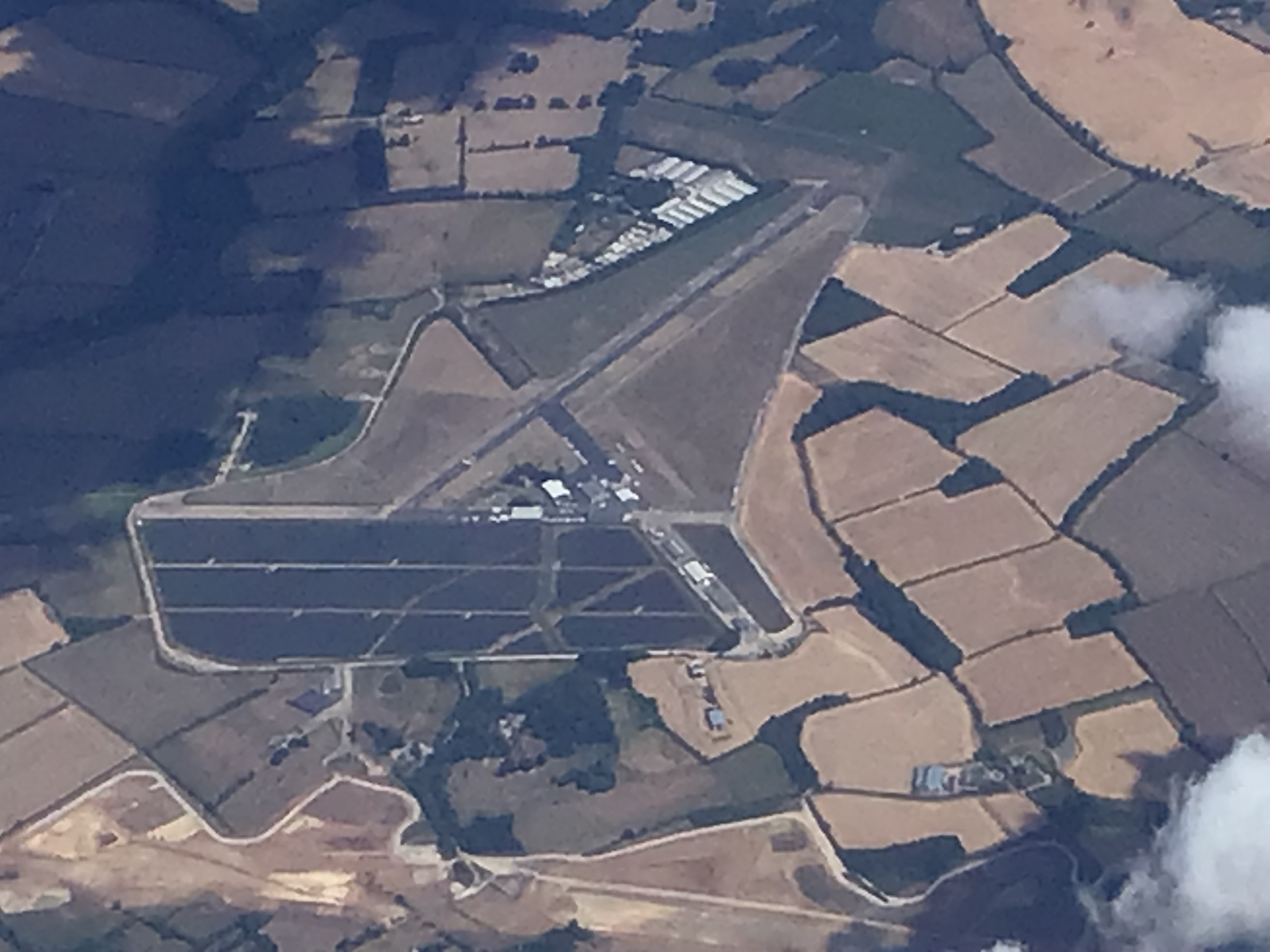

- IATA: none; ICAO: EGBT

Summary
- Airport type: Private
- Operator: Turweston Flight Centre Ltd
- Location: Turweston, Buckinghamshire, England
- Elevation AMSL: 438 ft / 134 m
- Coordinates: 52°02′27″N 001°05′52″W

Map
- Location in Buckinghamshire

Runways
Direction	Length		Surface
Direction	m	ft	Surface
09/27	1,256	4,121	Asphalt
- Sources: UK AIP at NATS

Turweston Aerodrome (ICAO: EGBT) is an airfield located near the village of Turweston, in north Buckinghamshire, England, near the Northamptonshire border. It is a former Royal Air Force Second World War bomber training facility, now a business park and airfield which is home to the Light Aircraft Association.

Turweston Aerodrome is no longer licensed by the CAA as of August 2015. It previously held an Ordinary Licence (Number P750) that allowed flights for the public transport of passengers or for flying instruction. It is not licensed for night use. The main runway is 09/27 and tarmac with a parallel grass runway available that doubles as a taxiway for the majority of the time. There is an additional grass cross runway that is used also as a taxiway and as additional parking for events orientation of 03/21.

Radio communication services are provided by Turweston Air/Ground on 122.180 MHz.

== RAF Turweston ==
Based on 220 acres (89 ha) of land in the northwest corner of Buckinghamshire, just off the A43 road and located 2 nautical miles (3.7 km; 2.3 mi) east of the market town of Brackley, RAF Turweston served as a bomber training school during the Second World War. Opened on 23 November 1942 it had three concrete runways and one T1 hangar. The three runways were:

- 10/28 - 2,000 yd × 50 yd (1,829 m × 46 m)
- 04/22 - 1,400 yd × 50 yd (1,280 m × 46 m) (later extended to 1,750 yd (1,600 m))
- 16/34 - 1,400 yd × 50 yd (1,280 m × 46 m)

It initially housed the Vickers Wellingtons and Avro Ansons of No. 12 Operational Training Unit RAF until April 1943, when it began housing the North American Mitchells of No. 13 OTU. In May 1943 they were joined by the Douglas Bostons of No. 307 Ferry Training Unit RAF, with both units remaining until closure. No. 17 OTU Gunnery Flight began arriving in July 1943 with Wellingtons, and formed fully in November 1943 with a flight of Miles Martinets.

Other types located at Turweston included: Airspeed Oxford; Westland Lysander; de Havilland Mosquito and the Hawker Hurricane.

The current runway 09/27 uses some of the old 10/28 runway, but does not use the whole width or length of the original runway.

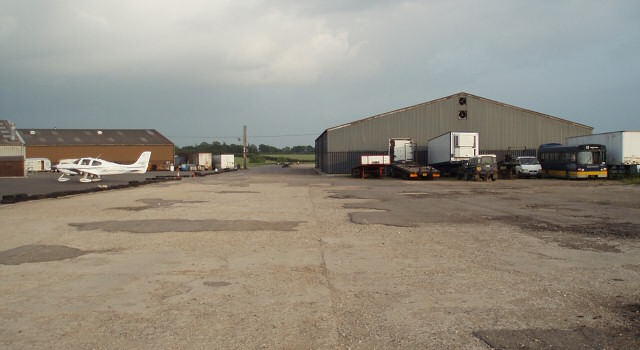
Turweston Airfield: This used to be one of three runways. The footpath along it nominally runs right through the centre of the large shed on the right (2007).

Wellington Bomber HZ437 crashed on 19 May 1943. It was a new aircraft with just 8 hours flying time. The port engine failed 30 minutes before the accident. It was reported by the RAF that the accident occurred due to the pilot's error of judgement, attempting to go round on one engine following an incorrect approach to the airfield. All five crew members were killed. They were: Pilot: Sgt. Sydney Barnes - RAFVR - Aged 21; Nav: P/O. Harold Geoffrey Allen Thompson - RAFVR - Aged 32; Air/Bmr : Sgt Robert Allen - RAFVR - Aged 22; W/Op/Air/Gnr: P/O. Raymond Kenneth Van Cleaf - RCAF - Aged 21; W/Op/Air/Gnr: Sgt. Edward James Roberts - Aged 19.

At the end of the Second World War, the RAF had a surplus of facilities, and many including Turweston were scheduled for closure. Turweston closed on 23 September 1945, but was retained by the Air Ministry. The land was used for private vehicle storage and agriculture.

In the 1950s, it was known as MTSSD TURWESTON, and was a sub-depot of COD Chilwell, housing the Army's stocks of Bren Gun Carriers. The maintenance staff consisted mainly of female civilians.

For some time prior to 1994 the airfield was in use as a gliding training airfield at weekends only. Turweston Aerodrome re-opened for business in 1994, having been rebuilt as a combined airfield, aero-club, flight school and rally track. The new conference facilities were opened in 2004, and the location has also served as a dance or rave venue, including the Gatecrasher Summer Soundsystem festival in 2008 and 2009.

Until 2011, Turweston hosted an annual Wings & Wheels event, which in addition to aircraft, showcased vintage cars, motorbikes, tractors and farm machinery. Also run annually is the overland Fast-Track service into the British Grand Prix.
