= Marianne Hesketh =

Actor and theatre manager

- Born: 15 May 1930; London, England
- Died: 24 April 1984; Dervaig, Mull

Marianne Hesketh n. Richards MBE ( 15 May 1930, died Dervaig, Mull, 24 April 1984) was an actor and theatre manager.

Marianne was an actor and theatre manager and was born in London on the 15 May 1930. Her parents were Rita Frances Turner, and Percival Thomas Richards, prison officer.

Hesketh married John Barrie Hesketh (b. 1930), who she met in London while they were training to be actors. They moved to Scotland in 1960 and three years later, opened a guest house in Dervaig in Mull.

Hesketh died on 24 April 1984.
