= Baron Hesketh =

Barony in the Peerage of the United Kingdom

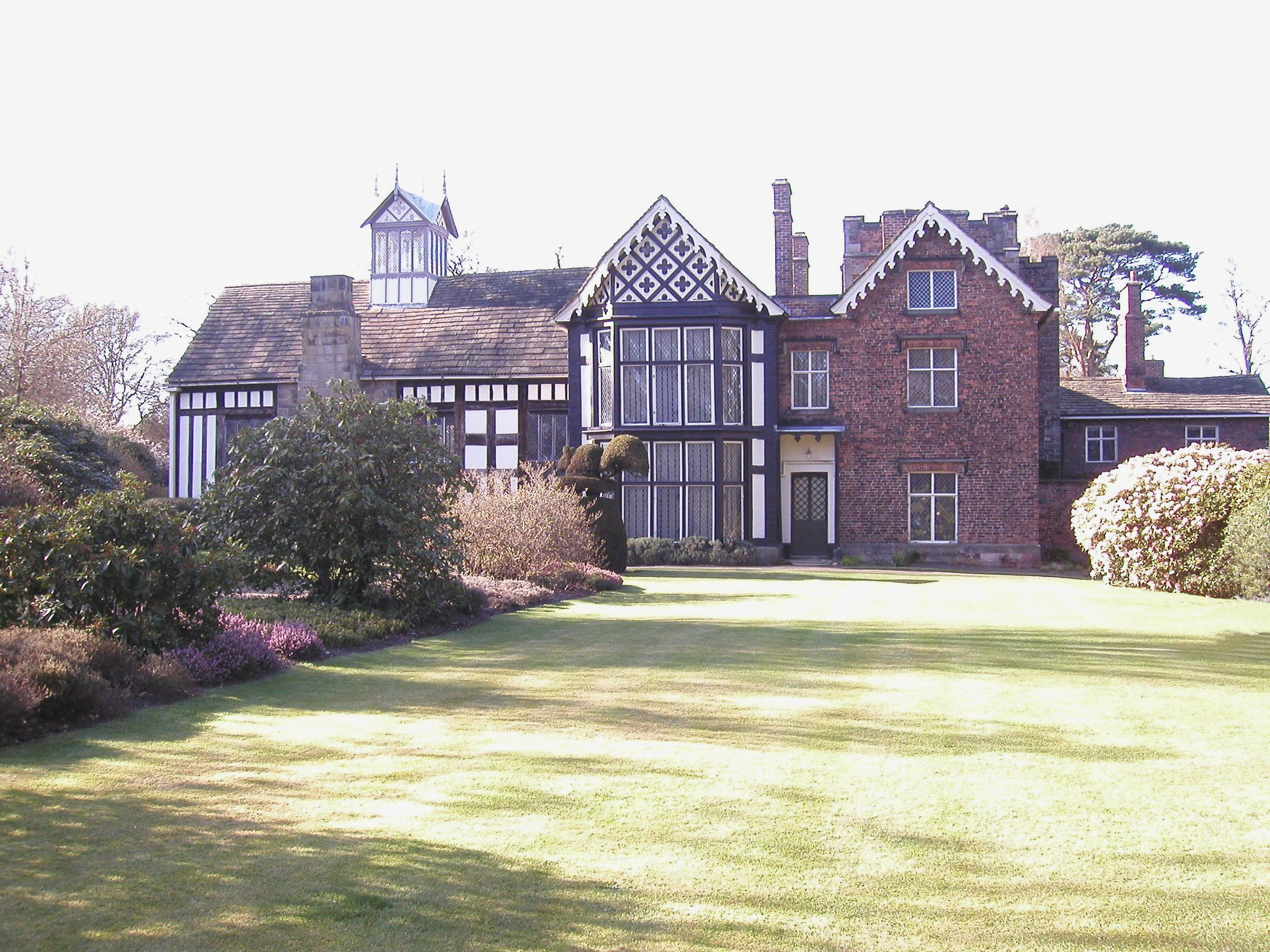
Rufford Old Hall, the original seat of the Hesketh family

Baron Hesketh, of Hesketh in the County Palatine of Lancaster, is a title in the Peerage of the United Kingdom. It was created in 1935 for Sir Thomas Fermor-Hesketh, 8th Baronet, who had previously briefly represented Enfield in the House of Commons as a Conservative. As of 2026 the titles are held by his grandson, the third Baron, who succeeded his father in 1955. Lord Hesketh held junior ministerial positions in the Conservative administrations of Margaret Thatcher and John Major. However, he lost his seat in the House of Lords after the House of Lords Act 1999 removed the automatic right of hereditary peers to sit in the upper chamber of Parliament.

The Hesketh baronetcy, of Rufford in the County Palatine of Lancaster, was created in the Baronetage of Great Britain on 5 May 1761 for Thomas Hesketh, with special remainder to his brother Robert, who succeeded him as second Baronet. The latter's great-great-grandson, the fifth Baronet, sat as a Conservative Member of Parliament for Preston. His grandson, the eighth Baronet, was elevated to the peerage as Baron Hesketh in 1935.

The former seat of the Barons Hesketh was Easton Neston in Northamptonshire. The house was previously the seat of the Fermor family (Earls of Pomfret since 1721), and came into the Hesketh family through the marriage in 1846 of Sir Thomas George Hesketh, 5th Baronet, to Lady Anna Maria Isabella Fermor sister and heiress of George Richard William Fermor, 5th and last Earl of Pomfret. However, the house and all contents were sold by the current Baron in 2005.

The original seat of the Hesketh family was Rufford Old Hall in the village of Rufford in Lancashire. This house was sold to the National Trust by the first Baron Hesketh in 1936.

== Former houses and estates ==
- Easton Neston
- Holmeswood Hall
- Meols Hall
- Rufford Old Hall
- Rufford New Hall

== Baronets of Rufford (1761) ==
- Sir Thomas Hesketh, 1st Baronet (1727–1778)
- Sir Robert Hesketh, 2nd Baronet (1728–1798)
- Sir Thomas Dalrymple Hesketh, 3rd Baronet (1777–1842)
- Sir Thomas Henry Hesketh, 4th Baronet (1799–1843)
- Sir Thomas George Hesketh, 5th Baronet (1825–1872)
- Sir Thomas Henry Fermor-Hesketh, 6th Baronet (1847–1876)
- Sir Thomas George Fermor-Hesketh, 7th Baronet (9 May 1849 – 19 April 1924)
- Sir Thomas Fermor-Hesketh, 8th Baronet (1881–1944) (created Baron Hesketh in 1935)

== Baron Hesketh (1935) ==
- Thomas Fermor-Hesketh, 1st Baron Hesketh (1881–1944)
- Frederick Fermor-Hesketh, 2nd Baron Hesketh (1916–1955)
- Thomas Alexander Fermor-Hesketh, 3rd Baron Hesketh (b. 1950)

The heir apparent is the present holder's son the Hon. Frederick Hatton Fermor-Hesketh (b. 1988).

== Line of succession ==
Thomas Fermor-Hesketh, 1st Baron Hesketh (1881–1944)
  - Lieutenant Hon. Thomas Sharon Fermor-Hesketh (1910–1937)
  - Major Frederick Fermor-Hesketh, 2nd Baron Hesketh (1916–1955)
    - Thomas Alexander Fermor-Hesketh, 3rd Baron Hesketh (b. 1950)
      - (1) Hon. Frederick Hatton Fermor-Hesketh (b. 1988)
        - (2) Alexander Frederick Fermor-Hesketh (b. 2021)
      - Hon. Robert Fermor-Hesketh (1957-1991)
        - (3) Blaise Isambard Robert Fermor-Hesketh (b. 1987)
      - Hon. John Fermor-Hesketh (1957-1991)
  - Major Hon. John Breckinridge Fermor-Hesketh (1917–1961)

== Coat of Arms ==
Coat of arms of Baron Hesketh
Crest 1st A garb Or banded Azure (Hesketh); 2nd Out of a ducal coronet Or a cock’s head Gules combed and wattled Gold. Escutcheon Quarterly 1st & 4th Argent on a bend Sable three garbs Or (Hesketh); 2nd & 3rd Argent a fess Sable between three lions’ heads erased Gules (Fermor). Supporters On either side a griffin Or gorged with a collar Gules thereon a fleur-de-lis Gold and charged on the shoulder with a rose also Gules barbed and seeded Proper. Motto Hora E Sempre

== See also ==
- Earl of Pomfret

Baronetage of Great Britain
Preceded by Asgill baronets	Hesketh baronets of Rufford; 5 May 1761	Succeeded by Delaval baronets
