= Thomas Fermor-Hesketh, 1st Baron Hesketh =

British peer, soldier and politician (1881–1944)

The Right Honourable The Lord Hesketh
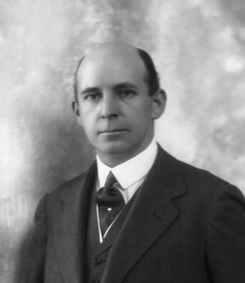
- Hesketh, 1927

High Sheriff of Northamptonshire
- In office 1932–1932
- Preceded by: Percy Lester Reid
- Succeeded by: William Thomas Sears

Member of Parliament for Enfield
- In office 1922–1923
- Preceded by: Henry Bowles
- Succeeded by: William Henderson

Personal details
- Party: Conservative
- Spouse: Florence Louise Breckinridge (after 1909)
- Parent(s): Sir Thomas Fermor-Hesketh, 7th Baronet; Florence Emily Sharon
- Education: Eton College
- Alma mater: Royal Military College, Sandhurst; Trinity College, Cambridge

Thomas Fermor-Hesketh, 1st Baron Hesketh (17 November 1881 – 20 July 1944), known as Sir Thomas Fermor-Hesketh, Bt, from 1924 to 1935, was a British peer, soldier and Conservative Member of Parliament.

== Early life ==
Hesketh was the son of Sir Thomas George Fermor-Hesketh, 7th Baronet, and Florence Emily Sharon, daughter of U.S. Senator William Sharon. Among his siblings was Frederick Fermor-Hesketh, a Lieutenant in the 9th Lancers who went missing in 1910.

He was educated at Eton, the Royal Military College, Sandhurst, and Trinity College, Cambridge.

== Career ==
He achieved the ranks of 2nd Lieutenant in the Royal Horse Guards, Captain in the Lancashire Hussars Yeomanry and Honorary Major in the Territorial Army and also served as a Justice of the Peace for Lancashire and for Northamptonshire. Hesketh sat briefly as a Member of Parliament for Enfield from 1922 to 1923 and was later High Sheriff of Northamptonshire in 1932.

He succeeded his father as eighth Baronet of Rufford in 1924 and in 1935 he was raised to the peerage as Baron Hesketh, of Hesketh in the County Palatine of Lancaster.

== Personal life ==
On 9 September 1909 Lord Hesketh married Florence Louise Breckinridge (1881–1956) at the British Embassy Church in Paris. She was the daughter of John Witherspoon Breckinridge and the former Louise (née Tevis), who married Thomas' uncle, Frederick W. Sharon, after divorcing her father. Her paternal grandfather was General John C. Breckinridge, the former Vice-President of the United States, and her maternal grandfather was Lloyd Tevis, the President of Wells Fargo Bank. They had three sons and two daughters:

- Hon. Thomas Sharon Fermor-Hesketh (1910–1937), a Lieutenant who was killed in an airplane accident in France in 1937.
- Hon. Louise Fermor-Hesketh (1911–1994), who married Sir Edmund Stockdale, 1st Baronet, in 1937.
- Hon. Flora Breckinridge Fermor-Hesketh (1913–1970), who married Rupert Baring, 4th Baron Revelstoke in 1934. They divorced in 1944 and she married Lt.-Cmdr Arnold Derek Arthur Lawson.
- Hon. Frederick Fermor-Hesketh, 2nd Baron Hesketh (1916–1955)
- Hon. John Breckinridge Fermor-Hesketh (1917–1961), who married Patricia Macaskie Cole in 1946.

Lord Hesketh died in July 1944, aged 62. As his eldest son Thomas was killed in an airplane accident in France in 1937, he was succeeded in his titles by his second son Frederick. Florence, the Dowager Lady Hesketh died 1956.

=== Descendants ===
His grandson Alexander Fermor-Hesketh, 3rd Baron Hesketh, is a former Conservative government minister.

== Arms ==
Coat of arms of Thomas Fermor-Hesketh, 1st Baron Hesketh
| Crest 1st A garb Or banded Azure (Hesketh); 2nd Out of a ducal coronet Or a cock’s head Gules combed and wattled Gold. Escutcheon Quarterly 1st & 4th Argent on a bend Sable three garbs Or (Hesketh); 2nd & 3rd Argent a fess Sable between three lions' heads erased Gules (Fermor). Supporters On either side a griffin Or gorged with a collar Gules thereon a fleur-de-lis Gold and charged on the shoulder with a rose also Gules barbed and seeded Proper. Motto Hora E Sempre |

Parliament of the United Kingdom
| Preceded by Henry Bowles | Member of Parliament for Enfield; 1922–1923 | Succeeded by William Henderson |
Peerage of the United Kingdom
| New creation | Baron Hesketh; 1935–1944 | Succeeded by Frederick Fermor-Hesketh |
Baronetage of Great Britain
| Preceded by Thomas George Fermor-Hesketh | Baronet (of Rufford); 1924–1944 | Succeeded by Frederick Fermor-Hesketh |
Honorary titles
| Preceded by Percy Lester Reid | High Sheriff of Northamptonshire; 1932 | Succeeded by William Thomas Sears |
