= Thomas George Fermor-Hesketh =

British baronet and soldier

Colonel Sir Thomas Fermor-Hesketh Bt
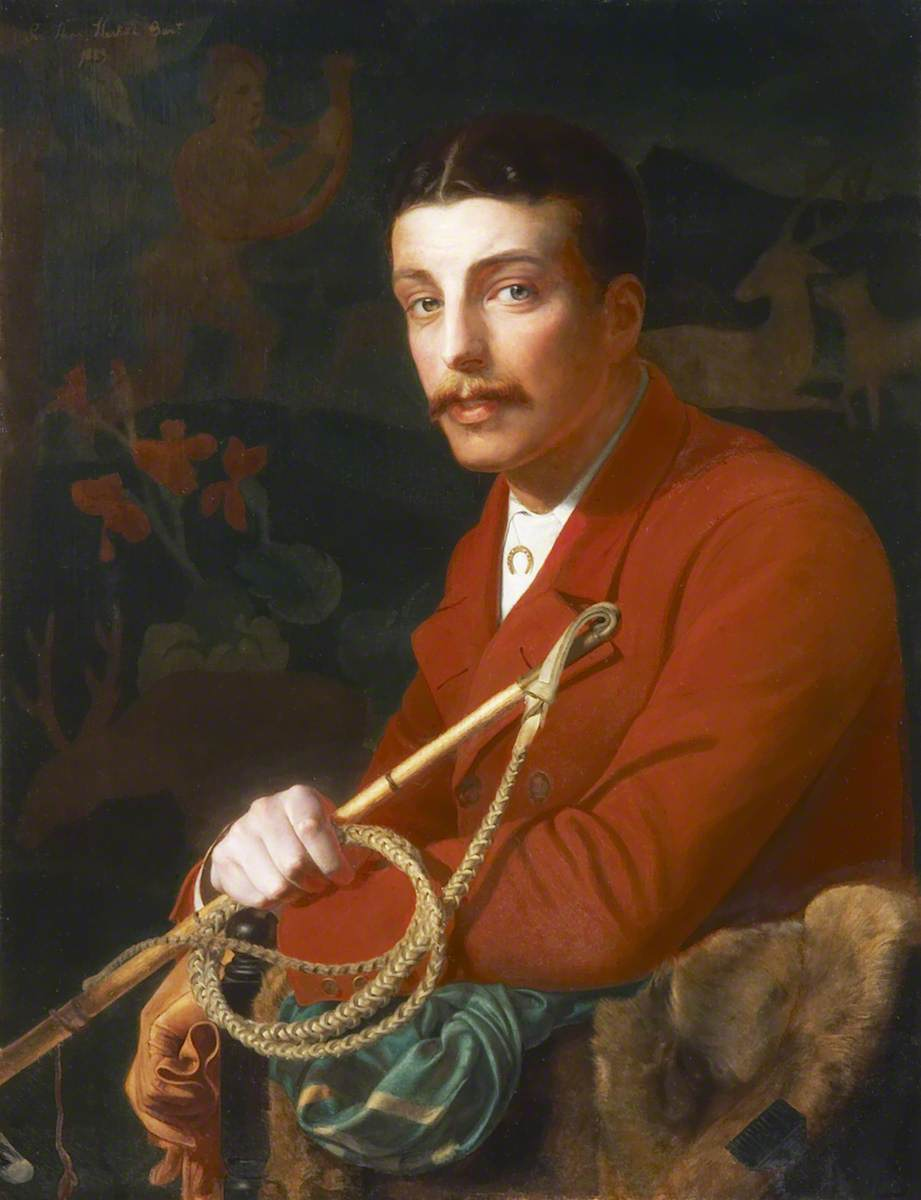
- Portrait by Frederick Sandys, 1883

High Sheriff of Northamptonshire
- In office 1881–1881
- Preceded by: Henry Vane Forester Holdich Hungerford
- Succeeded by: Richard Henry Ainsworth

Personal details
- Born: Thomas George Hesketh; 9 May 1849
- Died: 19 April 1924 (aged 74)
- Spouse: Florence Emily Sharon (m. 1880)
- Parent(s): Sir Thomas Fermor-Hesketh, 5th Baronet; Lady Anna Maria Isabella Fermor

Sir Thomas George Fermor-Hesketh, 7th Baronet (9 May 1849 – 19 April 1924) was a British baronet and soldier.

== Early life ==
Born Thomas George Hesketh, he was the second son of Sir Thomas Fermor-Hesketh, 5th Baronet, and Lady Anna Maria Isabella Fermor, daughter of Thomas Fermor, 4th Earl of Pomfret.

In 1867 he and his father assumed by Royal licence the additional surname of Fermor and in 1876 he succeeded his elder brother as 7th Baronet of Rufford.

== Career ==
Fermor-Hesketh was commissioned as a lieutenant in the Prince Consort's Own Rifle Brigade. In January 1879 he started a world cruise in his newly constructed steam auxiliary yacht Lancashire Witch. After he left Madeira en route to Montevideo news arrived there of the British defeat at the Battle of Isandlwana in the Anglo-Zulu War. The news eventually caught up with him at Sandy Point (Punta Arenas) in late March and he immediately set sail for Natal via the Falklands. He offered his services to the army and became ADC to Redvers Buller, becoming involved in mounted action at the Battle of Ulundi. He was appointed Honorary Colonel of the 4th (2nd Royal Lancashire Militia) Battalion, King's (Liverpool Regiment) in 1881, and continued in that role until his death.

After the war Sir Thomas continued his world cruise and in 1880 was instrumental in the attempted rescue at sea off the coast of Mexico of a number of citizens of San Francisco. In recognition of this, he was honoured by the city, and at a party in his honour. In 1881 he was appointed high Sheriff of Northamptonshire.

== Personal life ==
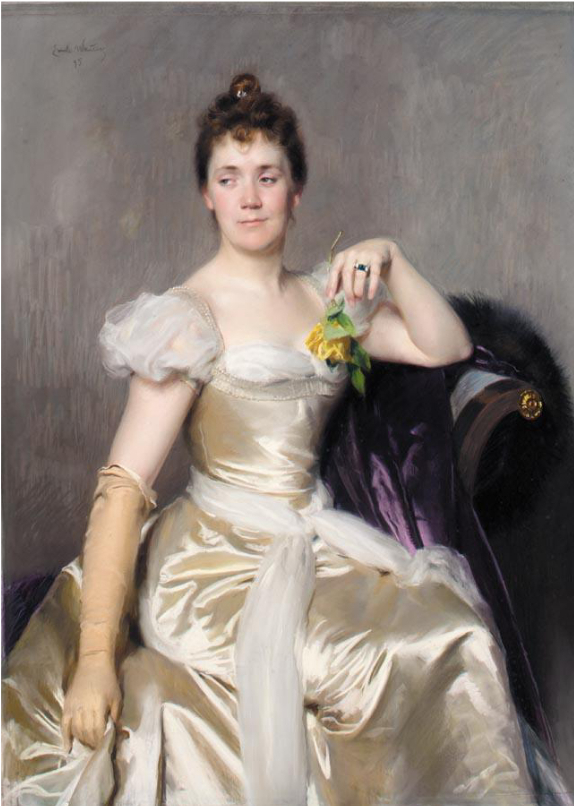
Portrait of his wife, Florence, Lady Fermor-Hesketh, by Emile Wauters, 1895

While in San Francisco, Sir Thomas came to the attention of the San Francisco heiress Florence Emily Sharon (1858–1924). Florence was the daughter of U.S. Senator William Sharon, who had made an enormous fortune in the gold, silver, banking and hotel business in California and Nevada. The first United States Senator from Nevada, Sharon was also the wealthiest man in the state. By the early 1880s, his empire was such that he was the largest single taxpayer in California. The two were married on 22 December 1880 at the Ralston Hall Mansion of Belmont, California, Together, they had two sons:

- Thomas Fermor-Hesketh, 1st Baron Hesketh (1881–1944), who also married an American heiress, Florence Louise Breckinridge, a daughter of John Witherspoon Breckinridge (son of Vice President John C. Breckinridge) and the former Louise (née Tevis) (a daughter of banker Lloyd Tevis). After her parents divorced, her mother married Frederick W. Sharon, the brother of Sir Thomas' wife.
- Frederick Fermor-Hesketh (1883–1910), who went missing in 1910.

When his father-in-law died in 1885, he left one third of his estate to his daughter Florence in a trust administered by her brother Frederick and brother-in-law Francis G. Newlands. When the trust expired, her part of the fortune passed to the Fermor-Hesketh family. They lived in Rufford Hall, Ormskirk, Lancashire.

Fermor-Hesketh died on 19 April 1924 aged 74, and was succeeded in the baronetcy by his son Thomas, who in 1935 was elevated to the peerage as Baron Hesketh. Lady Fermor-Hesketh died after falling down the stairs while visiting Euston Hall in September 1924.

=== Legacy ===
Hesketh Island, Kachemak Bay, Cook Inlet, Alaska was named after Sir Thomas following his visit to the area in his yacht Lancashire Witch in 1880.

Baronetage of Great Britain
Preceded by Thomas Henry Fermor-Hesketh	Baronet (of Rufford); 1876–1924	Succeeded by Thomas Fermor-Hesketh
