= Arundel marbles =

Collection of classical sculptures and inscriptions

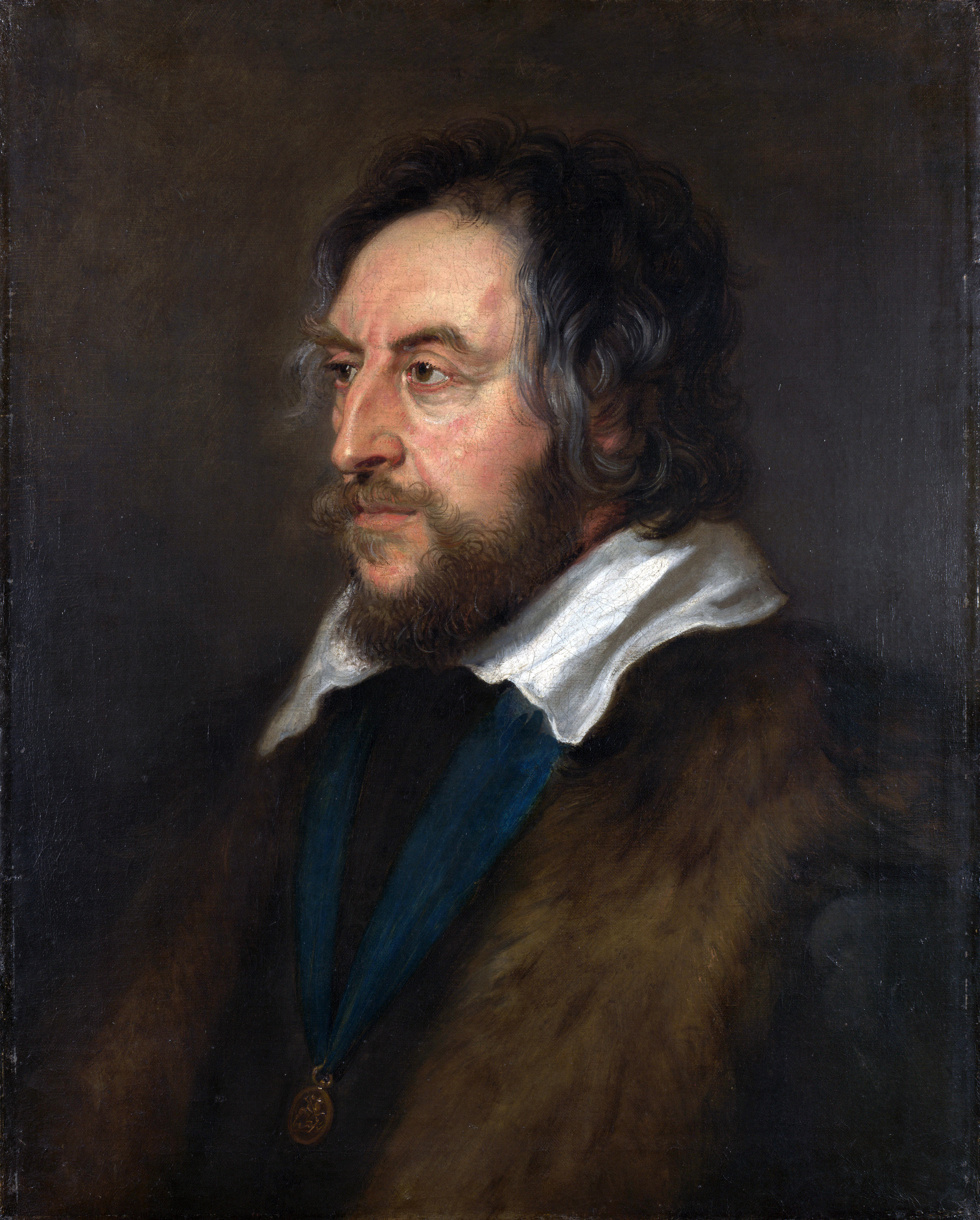
Thomas Howard, Earl of Arundel, collector

The Arundel marbles are a collection of stone Roman and Ancient Greek sculptures and inscriptions collected by Thomas Howard, 21st Earl of Arundel in the early seventeenth century, the first such comprehensive collection of its kind in England. They are now in the Ashmolean Museum, Oxford, having been donated in two groups.

== History ==
The bulk of the collection was a gift by Arundel's grandson Henry Howard, 6th Duke of Norfolk in 1667, at the prompting of John Evelyn and John Selden. The remainder were received in a second gift of 1755, when the extravagant 2nd Earl of Pomfret sold back to his mother, Henrietta Louisa, Countess of Pomfret, those that had been at his house at Easton Neston and she donated them to the Ashmolean, where they are sometimes called the Pomfret marbles.

The Earl of Arundel had supervised excavations in Rome, and deployed his agents in the Eastern Mediterranean, above all at Istanbul. Late in the seventeenth century, a visitor to Ottoman Turkey (in modern-day İzmir) could complain that:

the scarcity of antiquities now to be found in Smyrna arises from hence, that it furnished the greatest part of the Marmora Arundeliana.

The earl displayed his unrivalled collections at Arundel House, London, and one which his grandson did not leave to the collection, a 2nd-century AD relief from Ephesus is on display in the 17th century gallery at the Museum of London.

Some of these are not works of art but important inscriptions, the first Greek inscriptions that had been seen in England, from which historians have confirmed many dates in Greek history. Among them is the Parian Chronicle, inscribed about 263 BC so called because it was found on Paros, which gives Greek dates from 1582 BC down to 354 BC Among outstanding pieces is a relief that shows parts of the human body, outstretched arms: elbow to finger tips, foot, clenched fists and fingers each used as in that period of Ancient Greece as standard units of measure. Another important object from Arundel's collection is the so-called Arundel Head, a Hellenistic bronze portrait of a philosopher or king from Asia Minor now in the British Museum.

The Arundel marbles were catalogued as early as 1628, when, at the suggestion of Sir Robert Bruce Cotton, John Selden compiled a catalogue: Marmora Arundelliana with the assistance of two others, Patrick Young and Richard James. In 1763 Richard Chandler published a fine edition of the inscriptions as Arundelian Marbles, Marmora Oxoniensia with a Latin translation, and a number of suggestions for filling the lacunae (gaps).

== Gallery ==
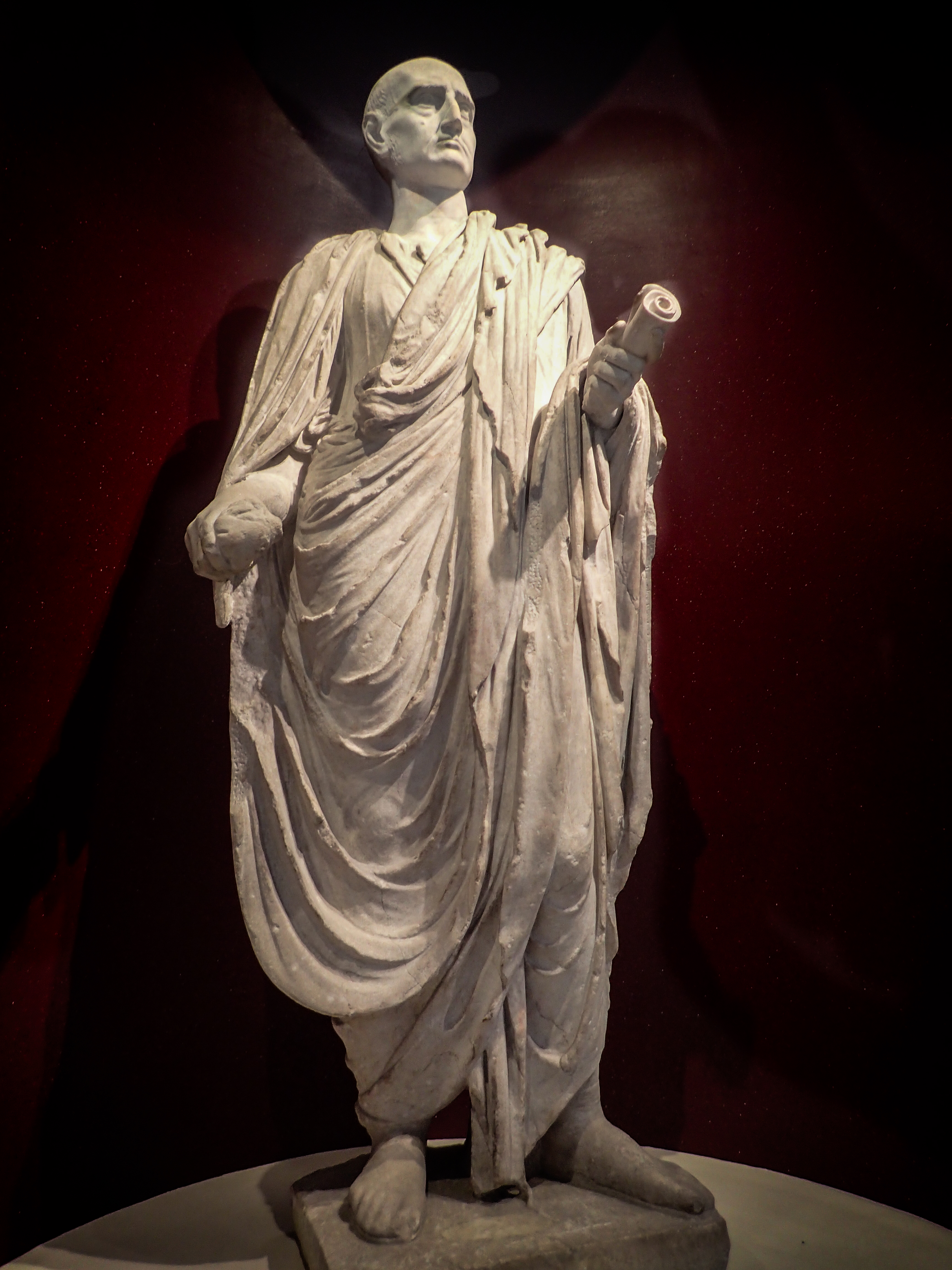
So-called Cicero excavated by the Earl of Arundel in Rome between 1613 and 1614

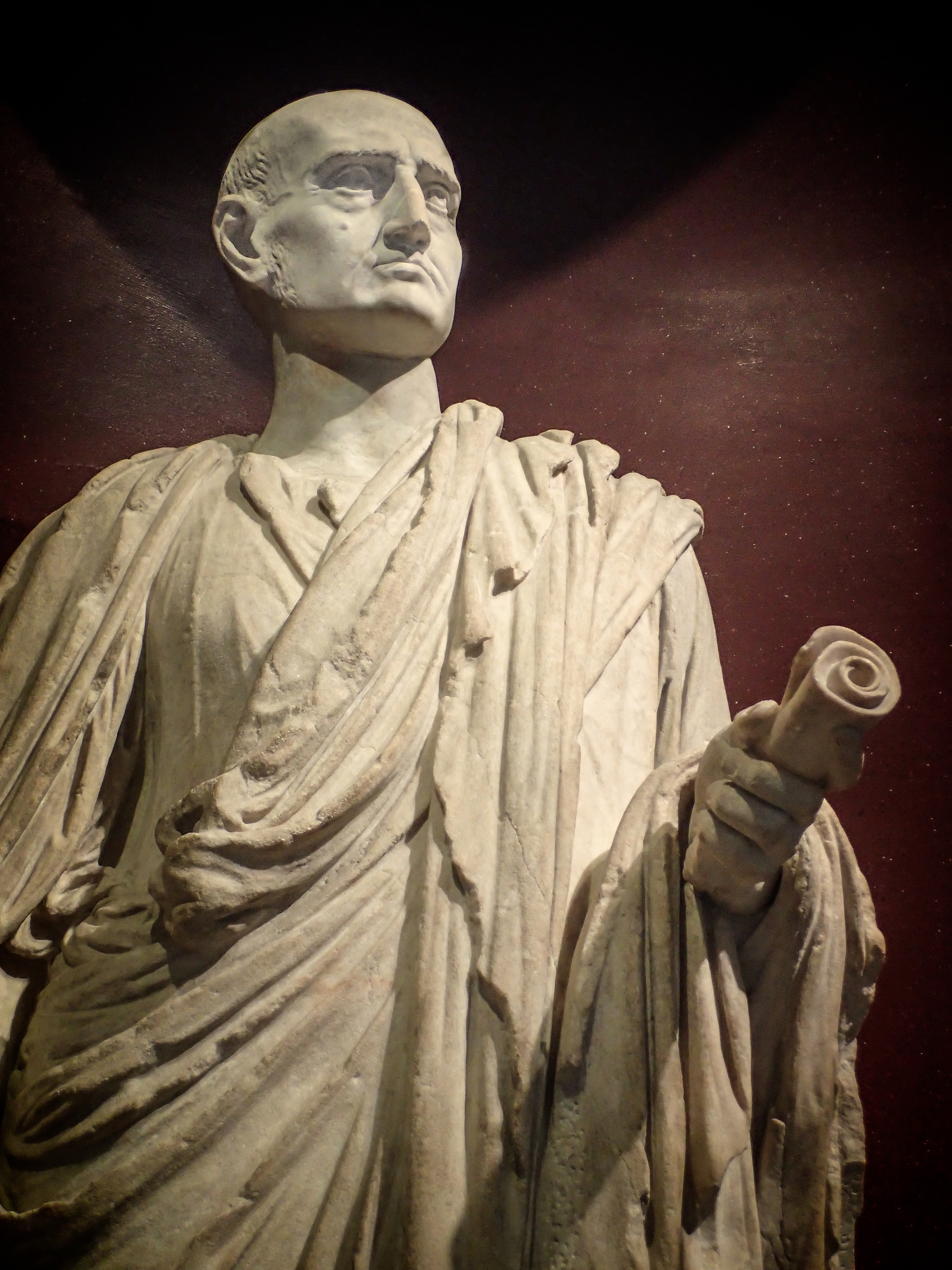
So-called Cicero excavated by the Earl of Arundel in Rome between 1613 and 1614

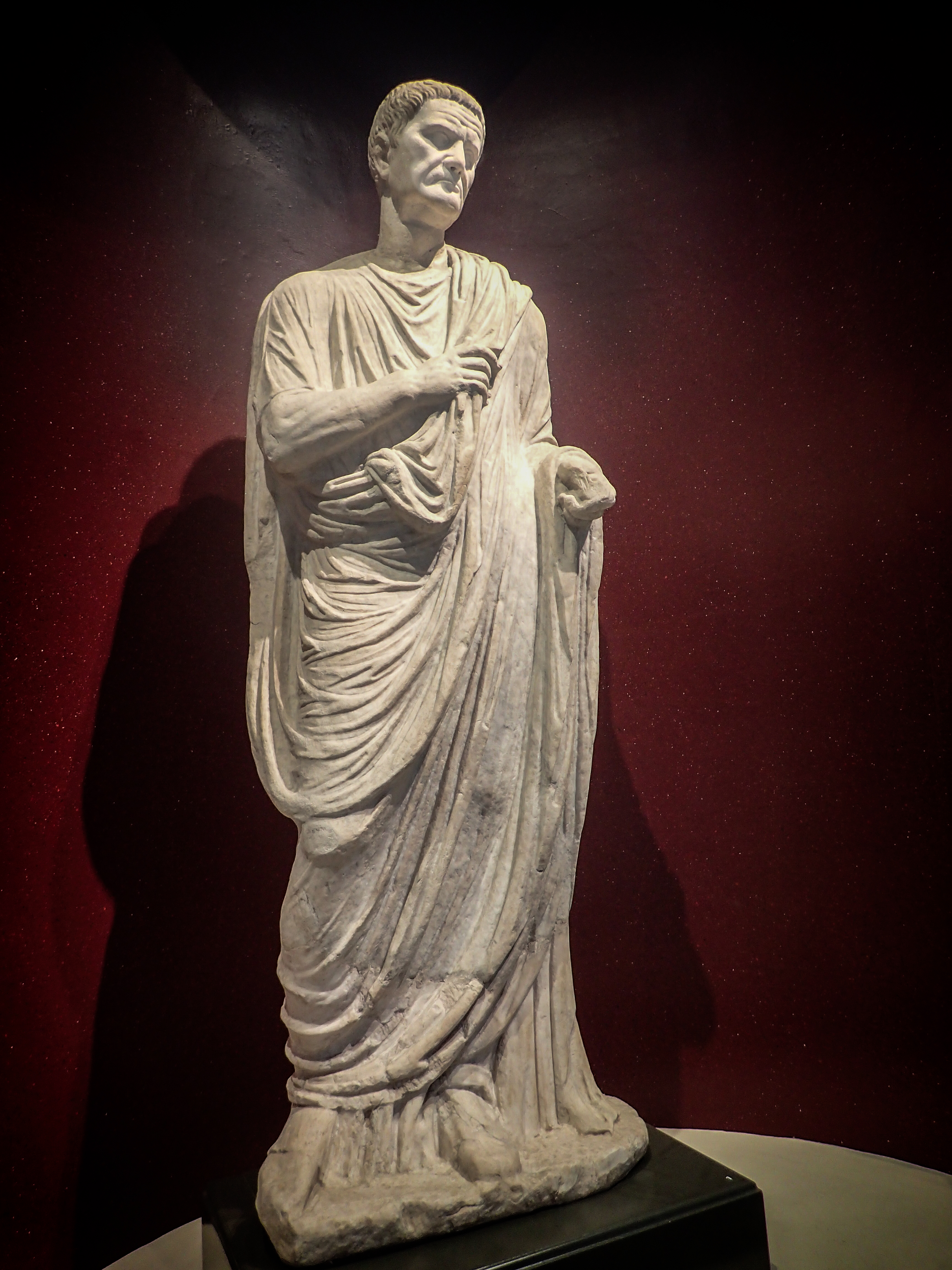
Man wearing a toga excavated in Rome 1613–1614 and later given the name "Caius Marius"

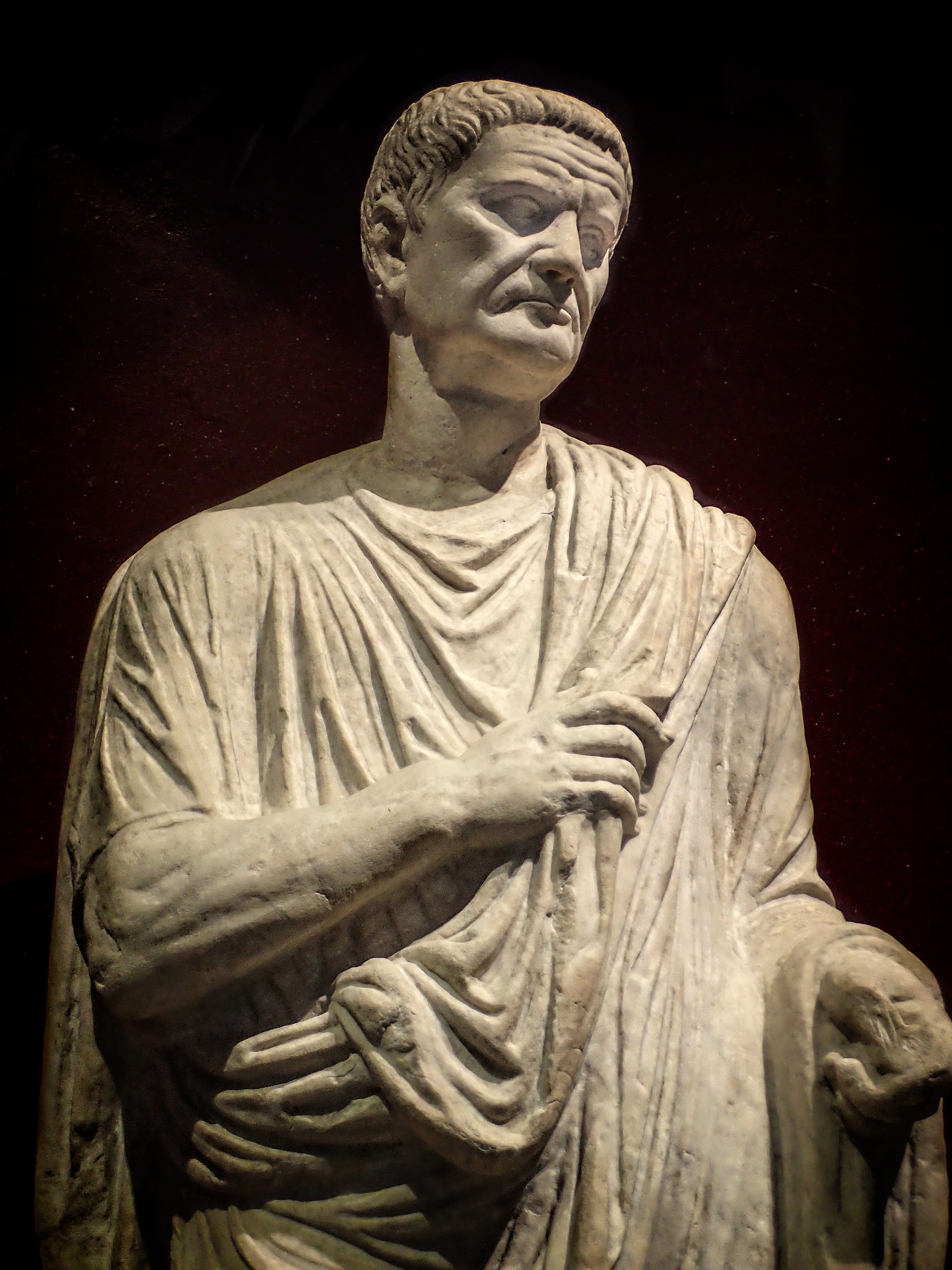
First-century CE togate torso bearing a 17th-century CE head dubbed Caius Marius by the Earl of Arundel excavated in 1613-1614 CE

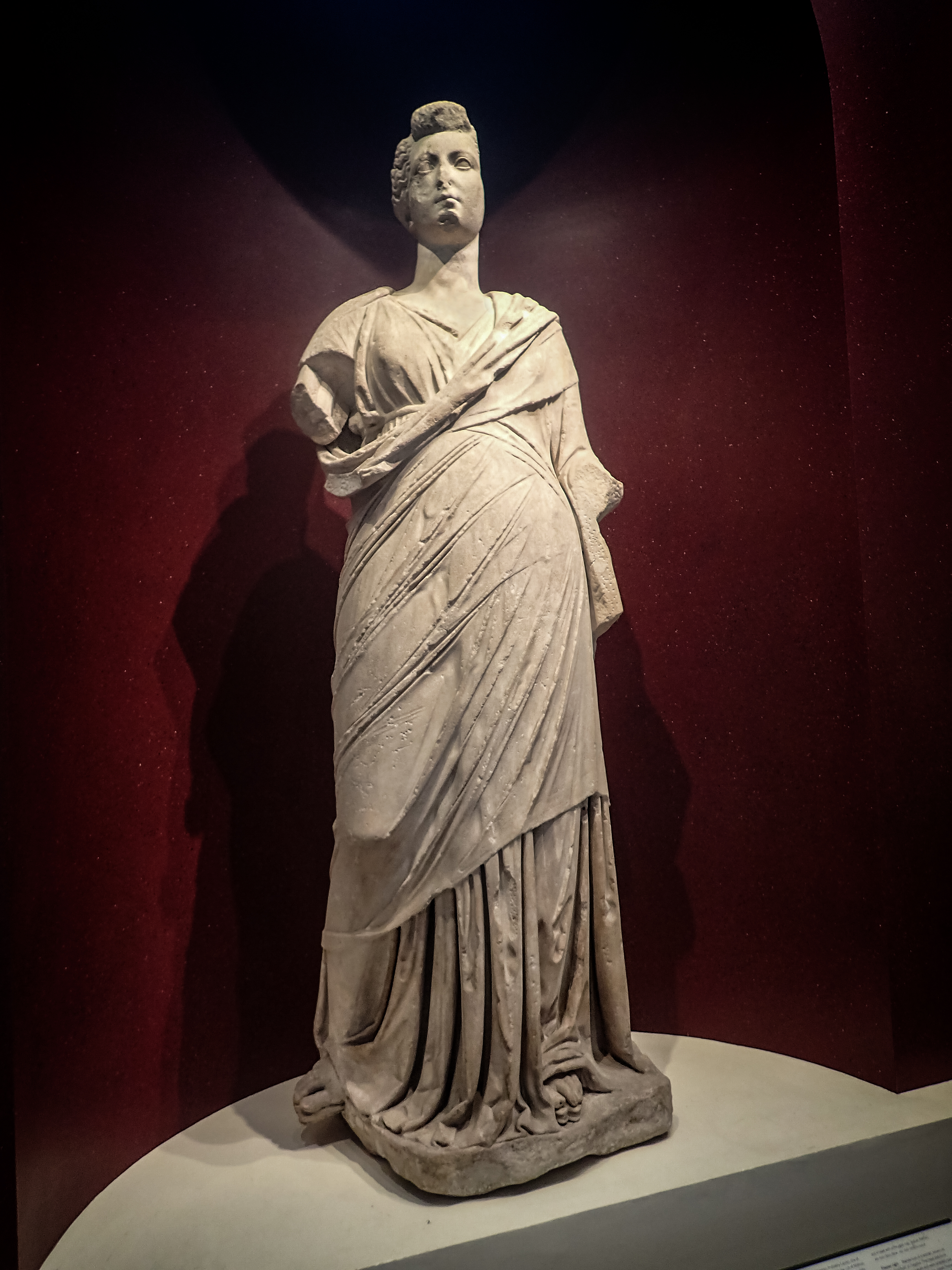
Statue of a woman with hairstyle dating to the later Roman Republican or Augustan period but body dating to 200–100 BCE

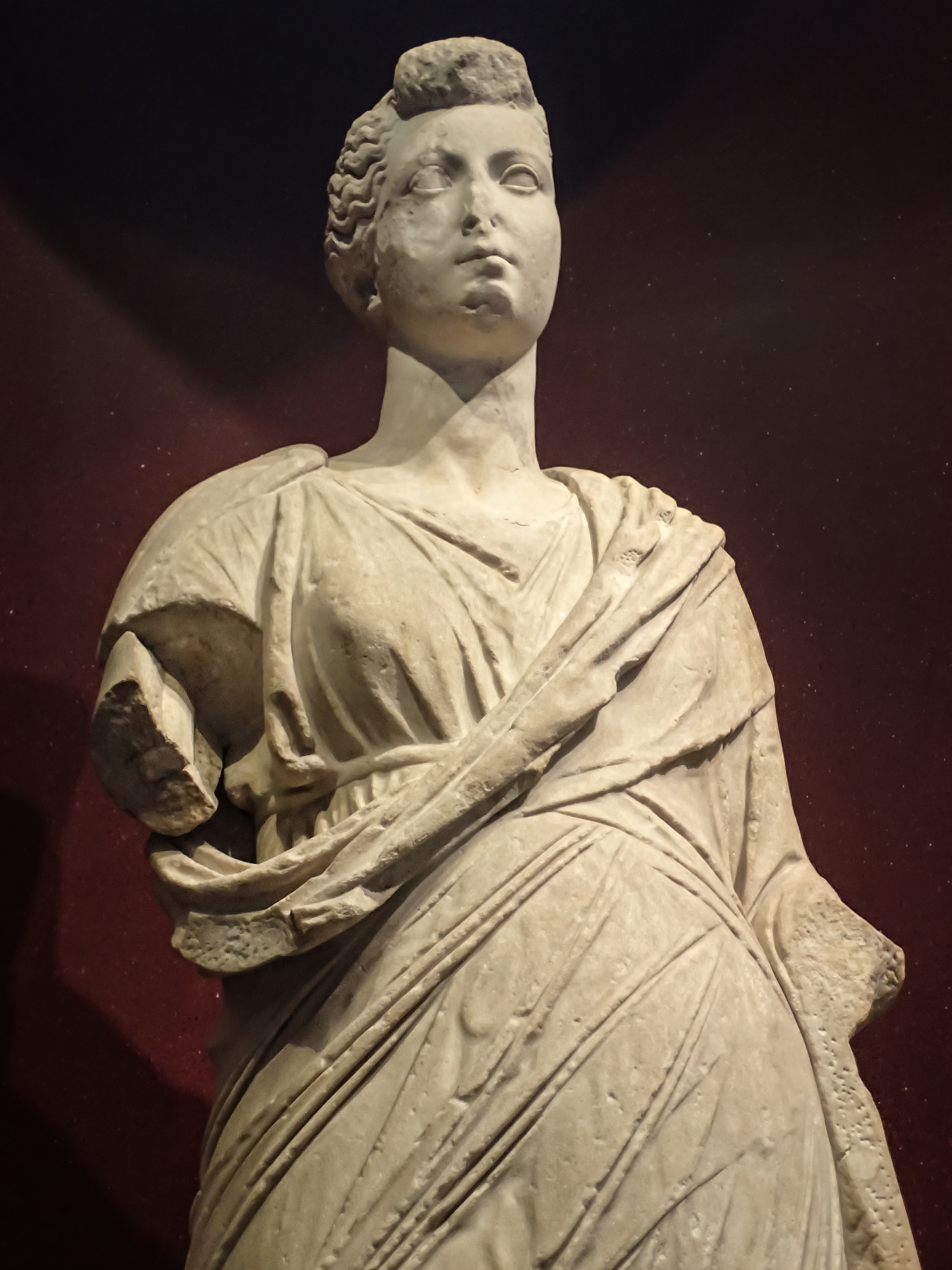
Closeup of statue of a woman with hairstyle dating to the later Roman Republican or Augustan period but body dating to 200–100 BCE

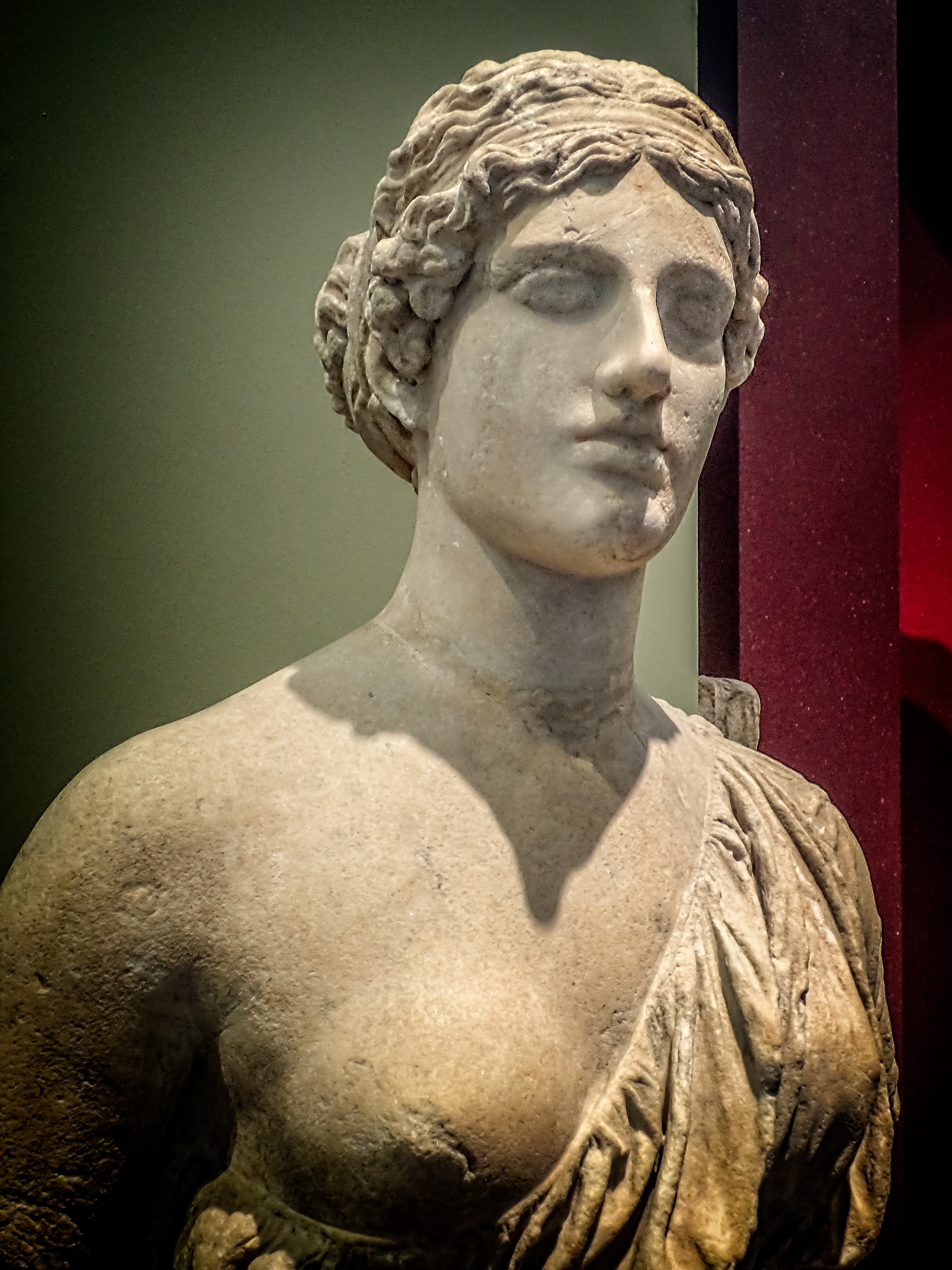
The Oxford Bust or "Sappho" with head and torso coming from different statues and probably put together by a sculptor in the 1600s

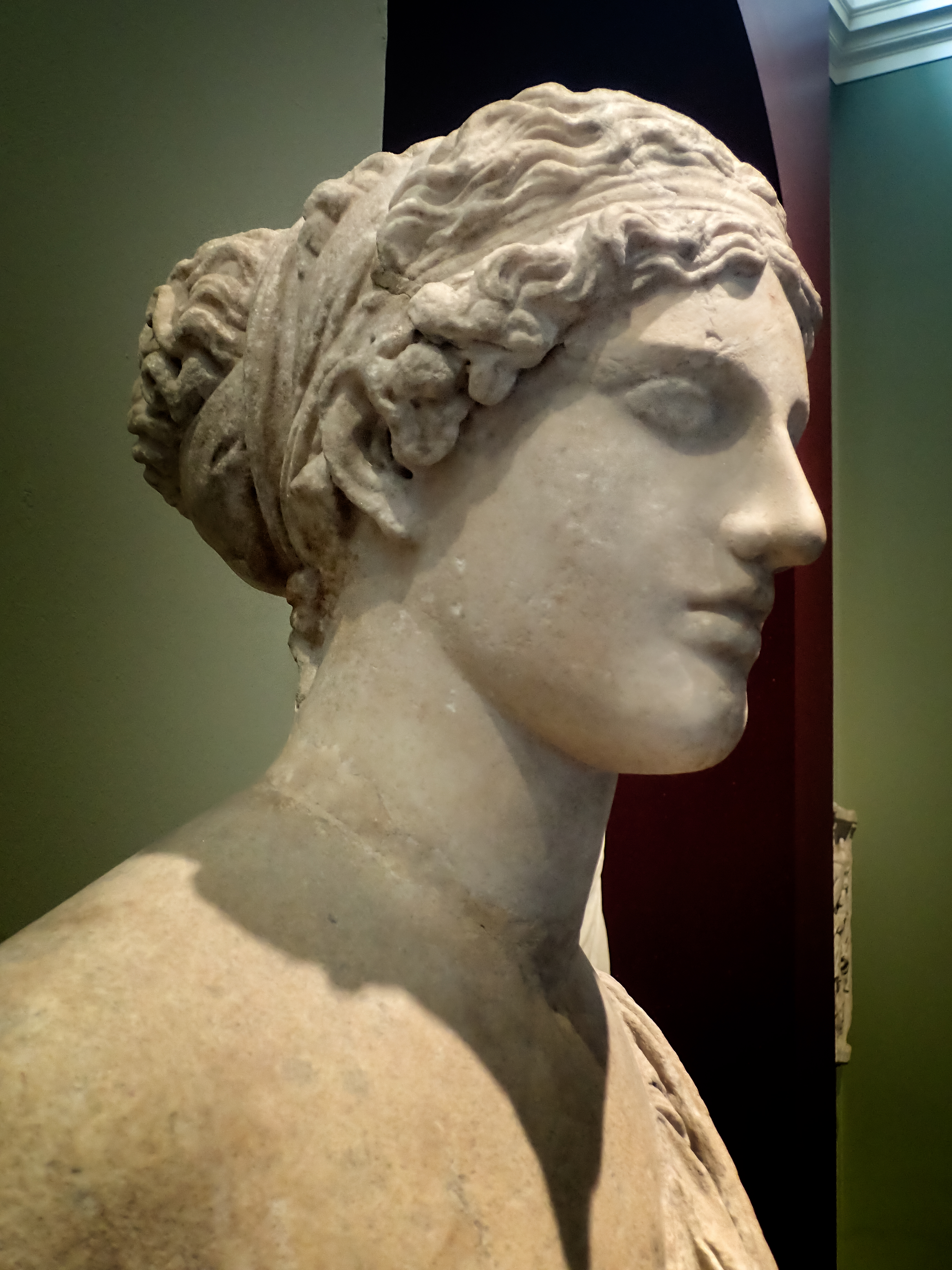
The Oxford Bust or "Sappho" with head and torso coming from different statues and probably put together by a sculptor in the 1600s View 2

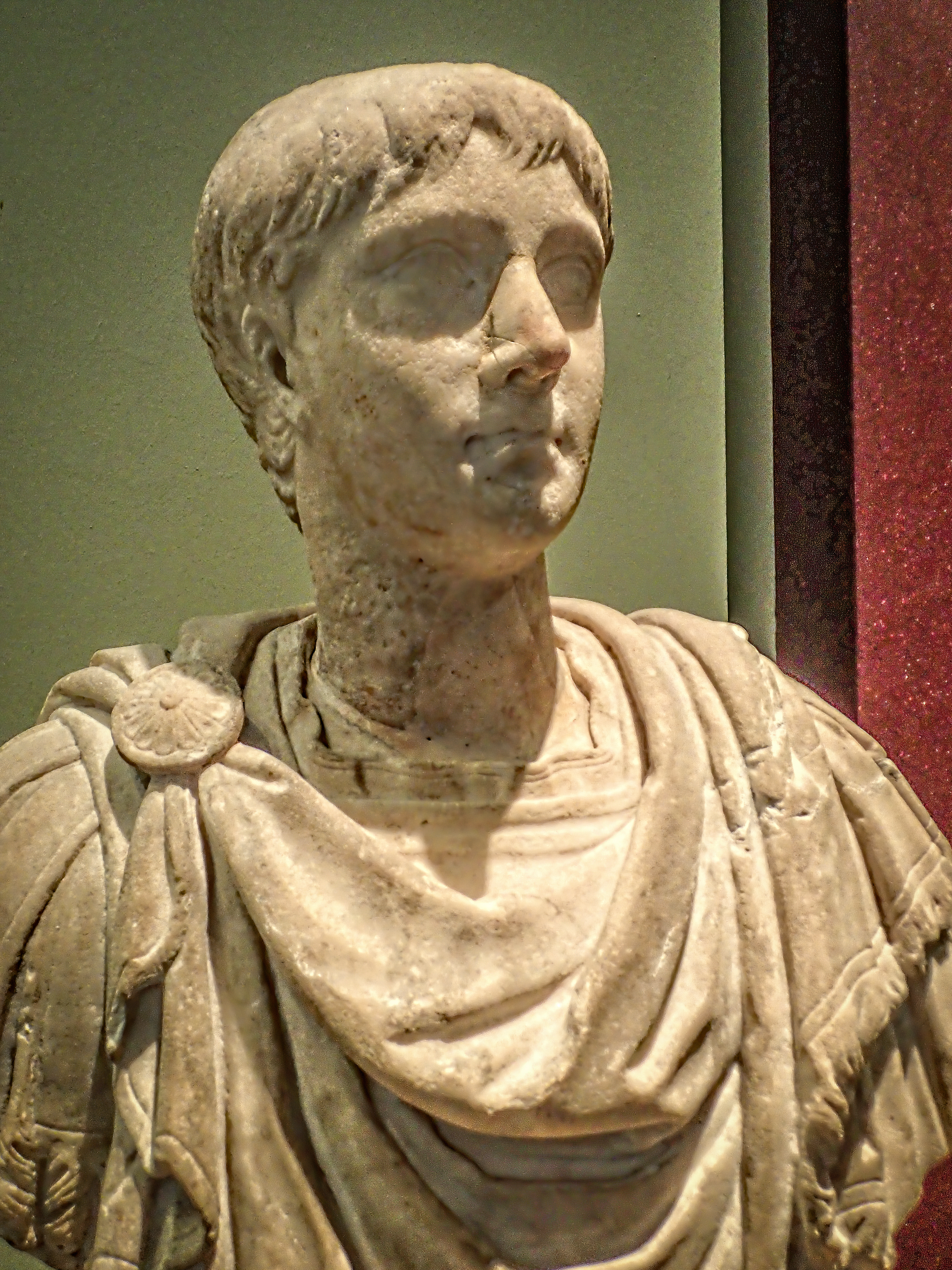
Portrait of a young man with hairstyle, facial features and long neck pointing to portraits made in the early 100s CE

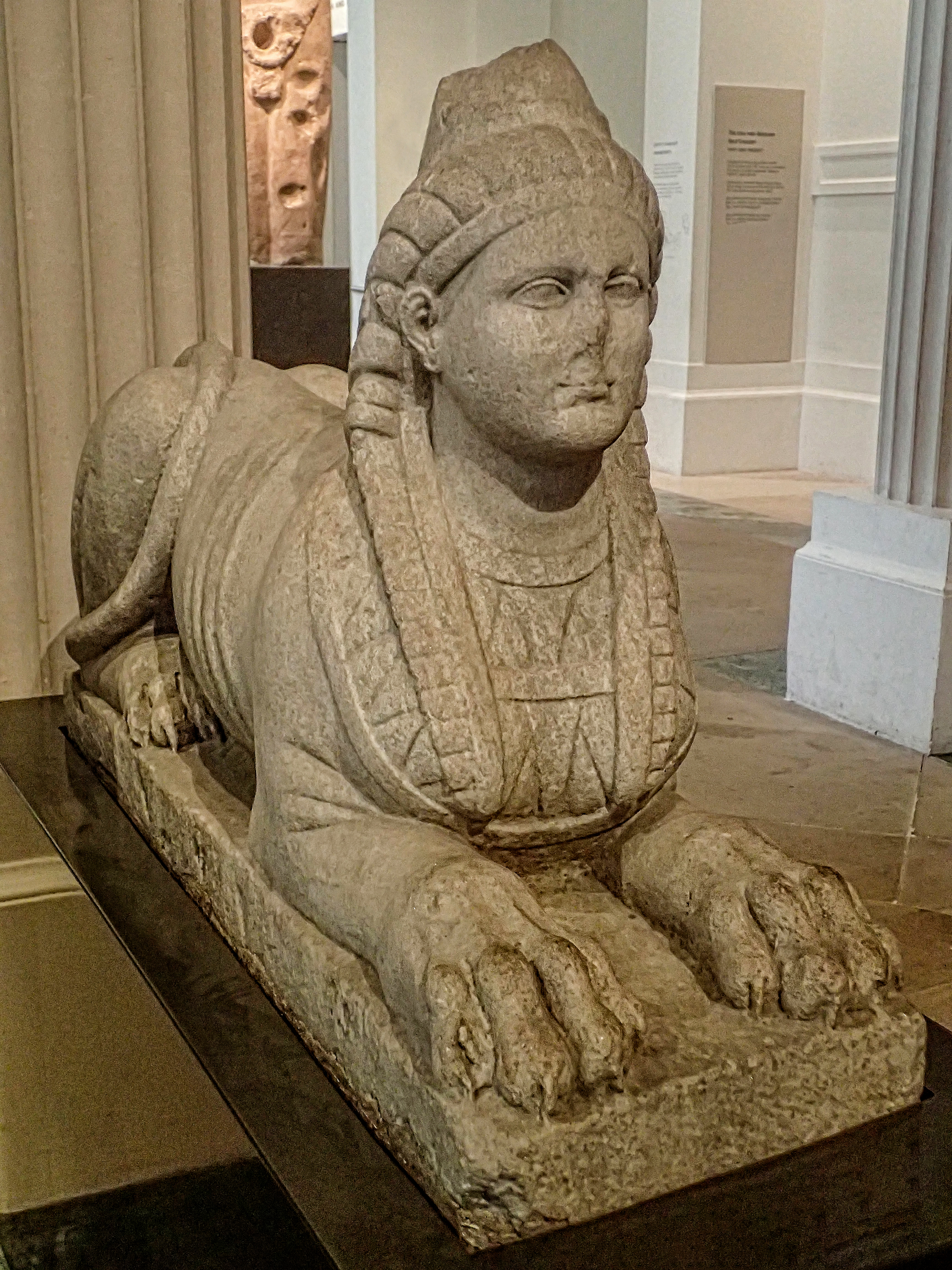
Sphinx commissioned by the Earl of Arundel to partner a Roman Sphinx, 17th century CE

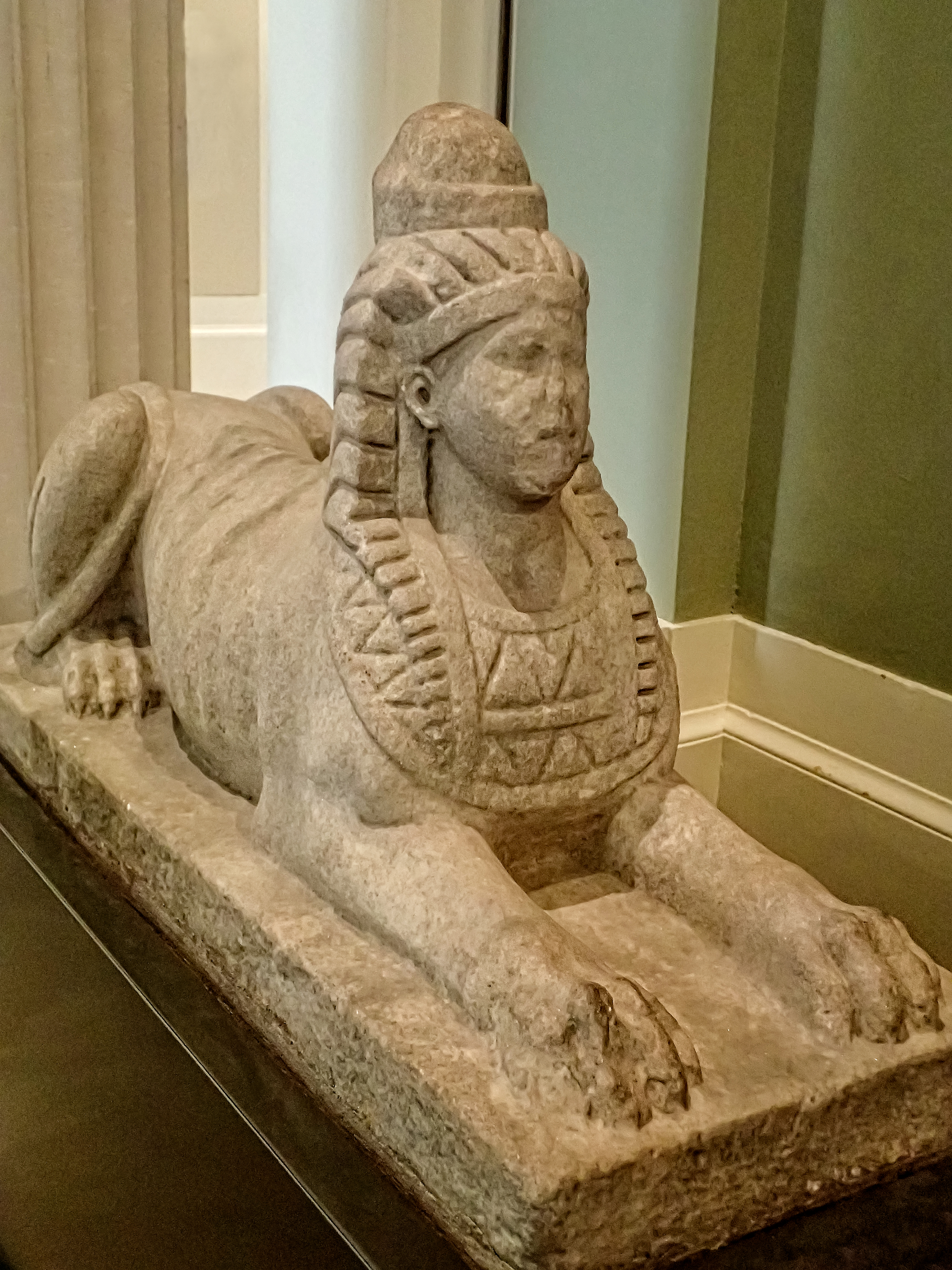
Sphinx, Roman, 50–200 CE.

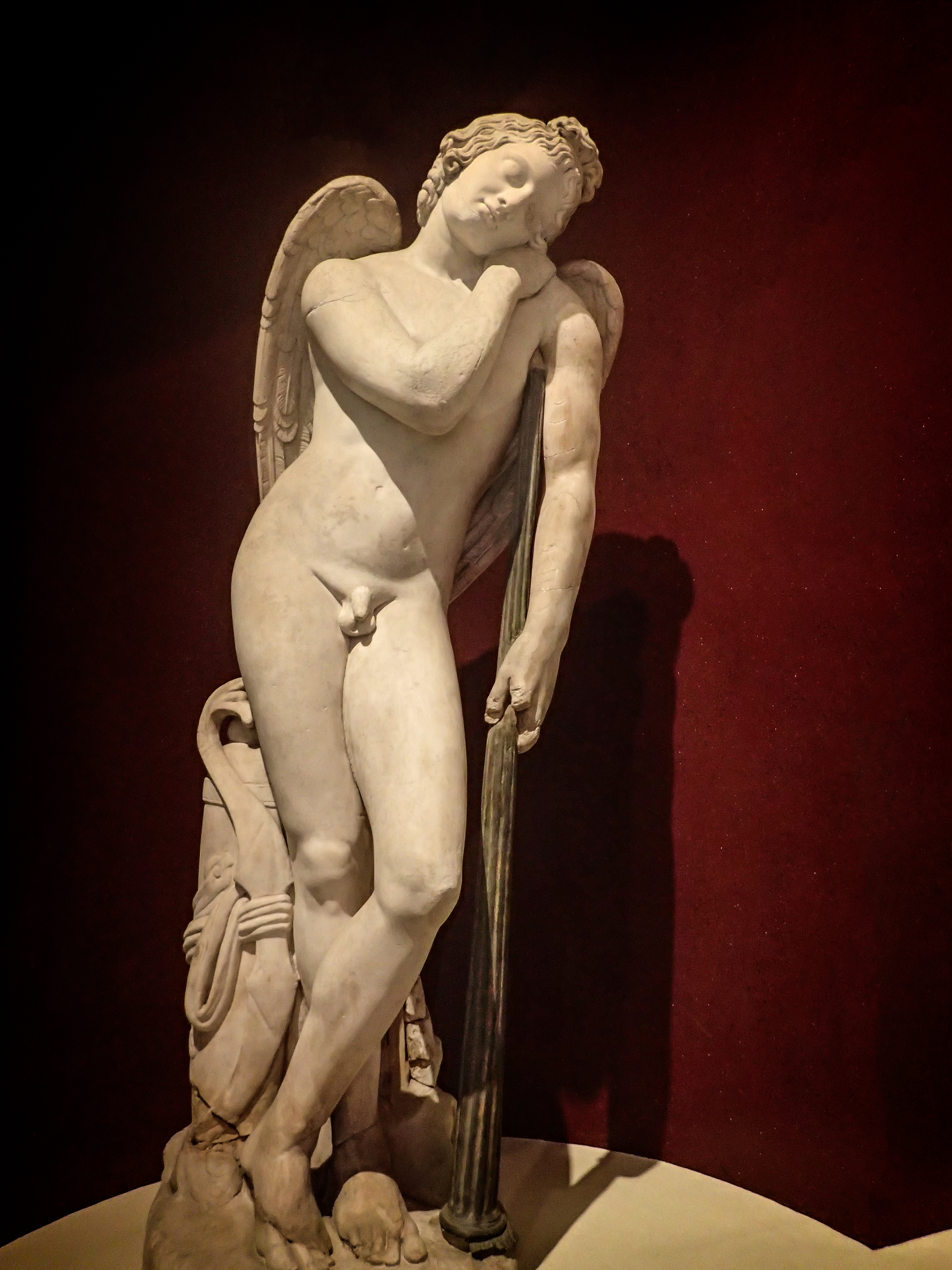
Roman statue of Eros, 100-200 CE depicting Eros sleeping, his torch turned down, a symbol of death used in many Roman memorials.

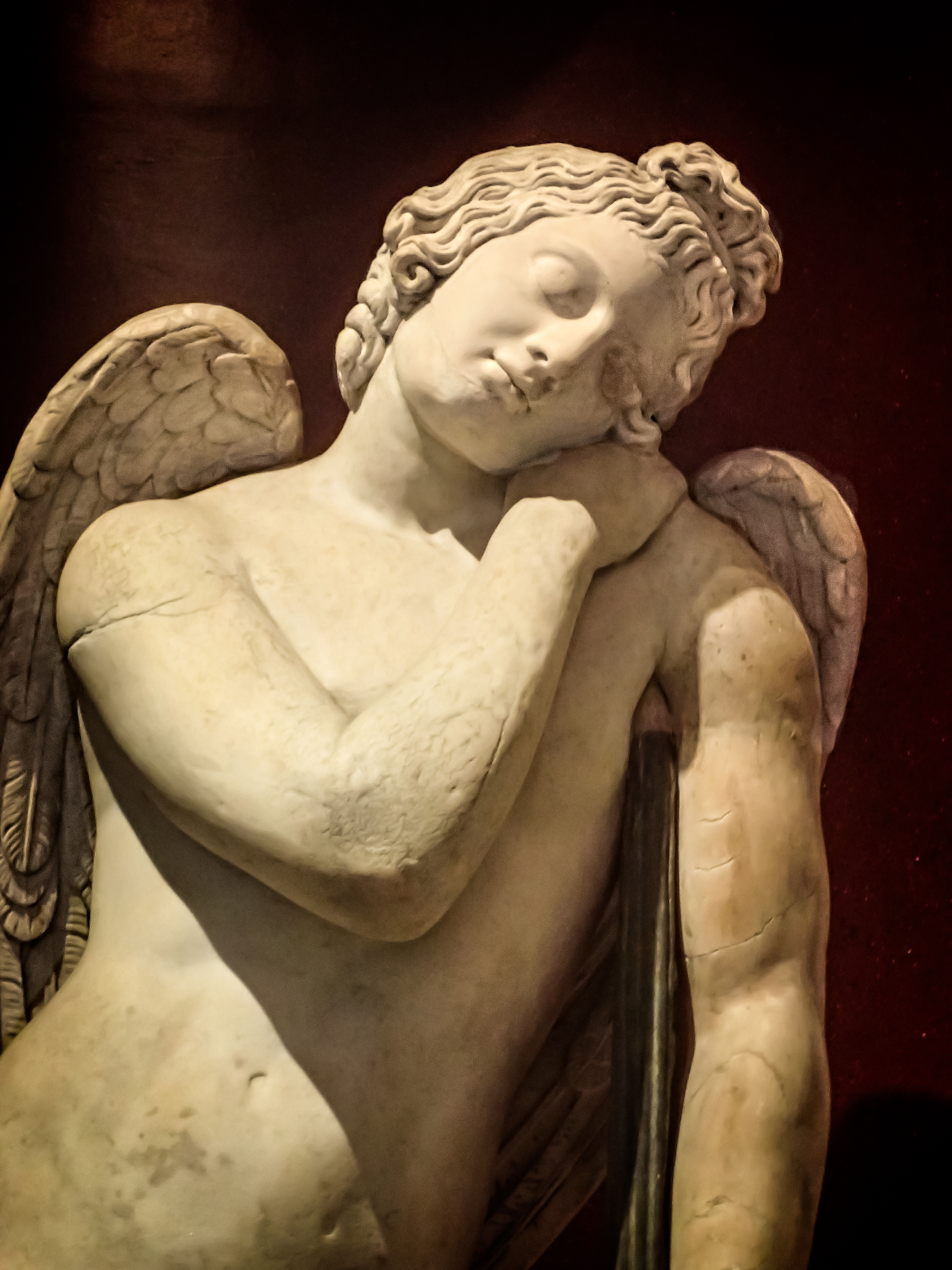
Closeup of Roman statue of Eros, 100–200 CE depicting Eros sleeping, his torch turned down, a symbol of death used in many Roman memorials.

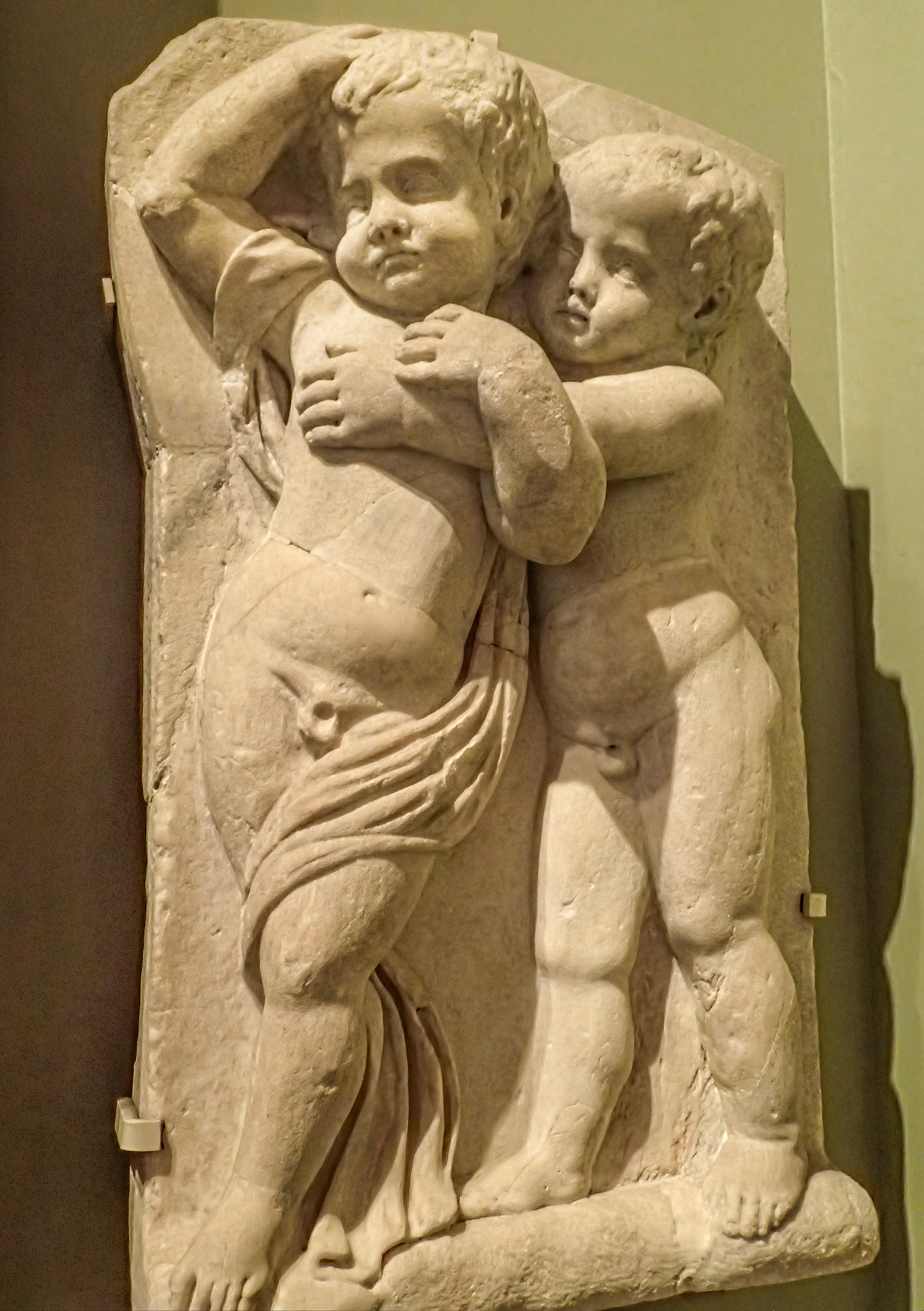
Fragment of a marble sarcophagus depicting two drunken boys from a Bacchic revel, made in Athens 140–150 CE
