= Arundel Head =

Hellenistic bronze portrait

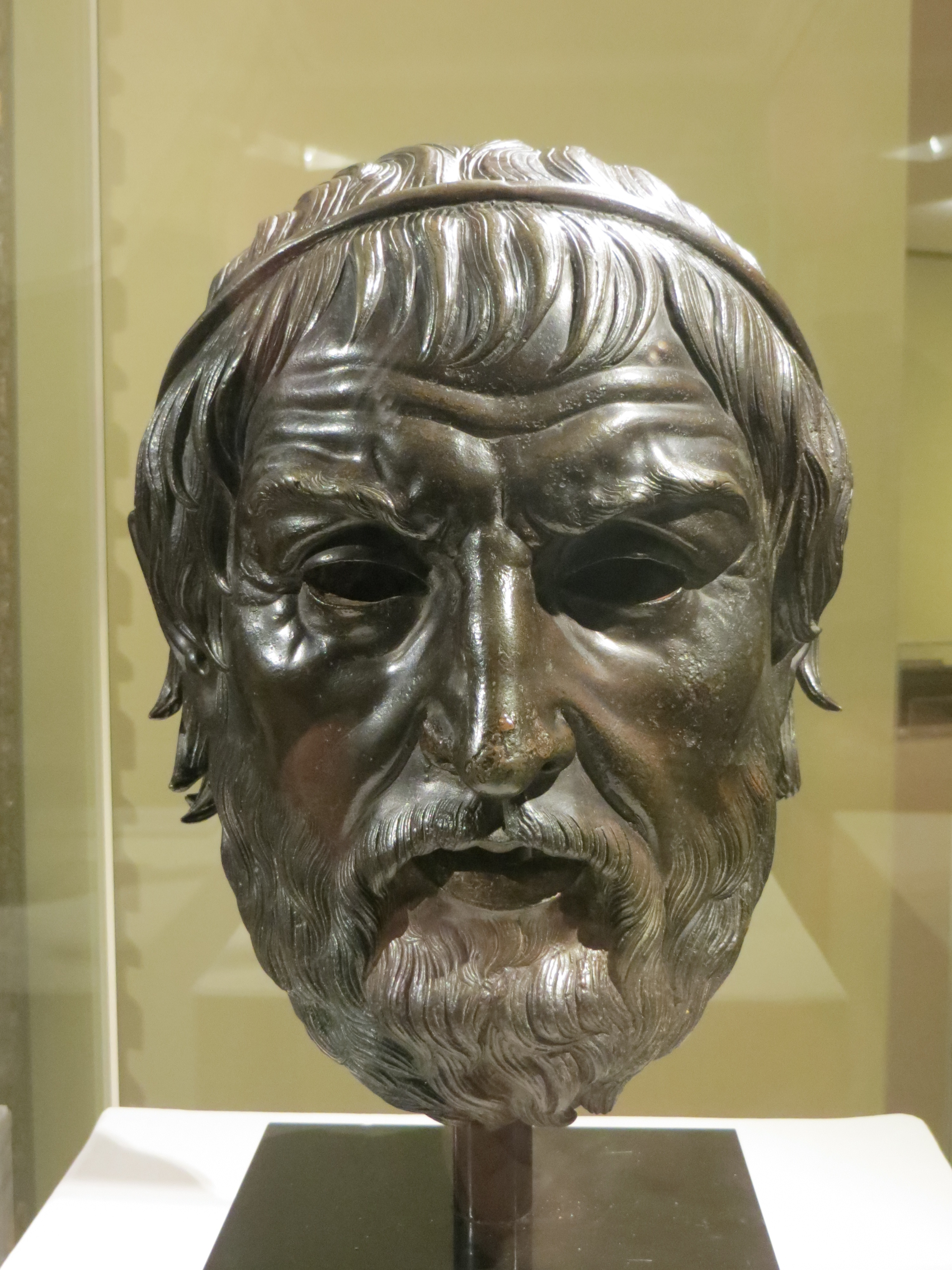
- Arundel Head in the British Museum
- Material: Bronze
- Size: 29.5 cm high
- Created: 2nd-1st Century BC
- Present location: British Museum, London
- Registration: GR 1760.9-19.1 (Bronze 847)

The Arundel Head is a Hellenistic bronze portrait of a dramatist or king from Asia Minor, now kept in the British Museum. Dating to the 2nd-1st centuries BC, the head once belonged to (and takes its name from) the famous English collector of classical antiquities, Thomas Howard, 21st Earl of Arundel.

== Description ==
The head is all that remains of a life-size bronze statue. The artist has realistically conveyed the worn features of an old man, including a wrinkled forehead, almond-shaped eyes and pouting mouth, which gives the portrait an air of power and authority. The hair of this bronze masterpiece is tied down in a ribbon, which suggests it may have portrayed a poet. Once thought to represent the ancient Greek writer Homer, it is currently considered to personify either the ancient Greek playwright Sophocles or a Macedonian King.

== Provenance ==
Recent research has suggested that the Arundel Head may have originally been found in Smyrna, the ancient name for İzmir in Turkey. The bronze sculpture was brought to England from Constantinople in the early seventeenth century as part of the collection of Thomas Howard, 21st Earl of Arundel. Subsequently, it came into the possession of Dr Richard Mead and later Brownlow Cecil, 9th Earl of Exeter, who donated it to the British Museum in 1760, making it one of the earliest pieces of classical antiquities to enter the national collection.

== Gallery ==
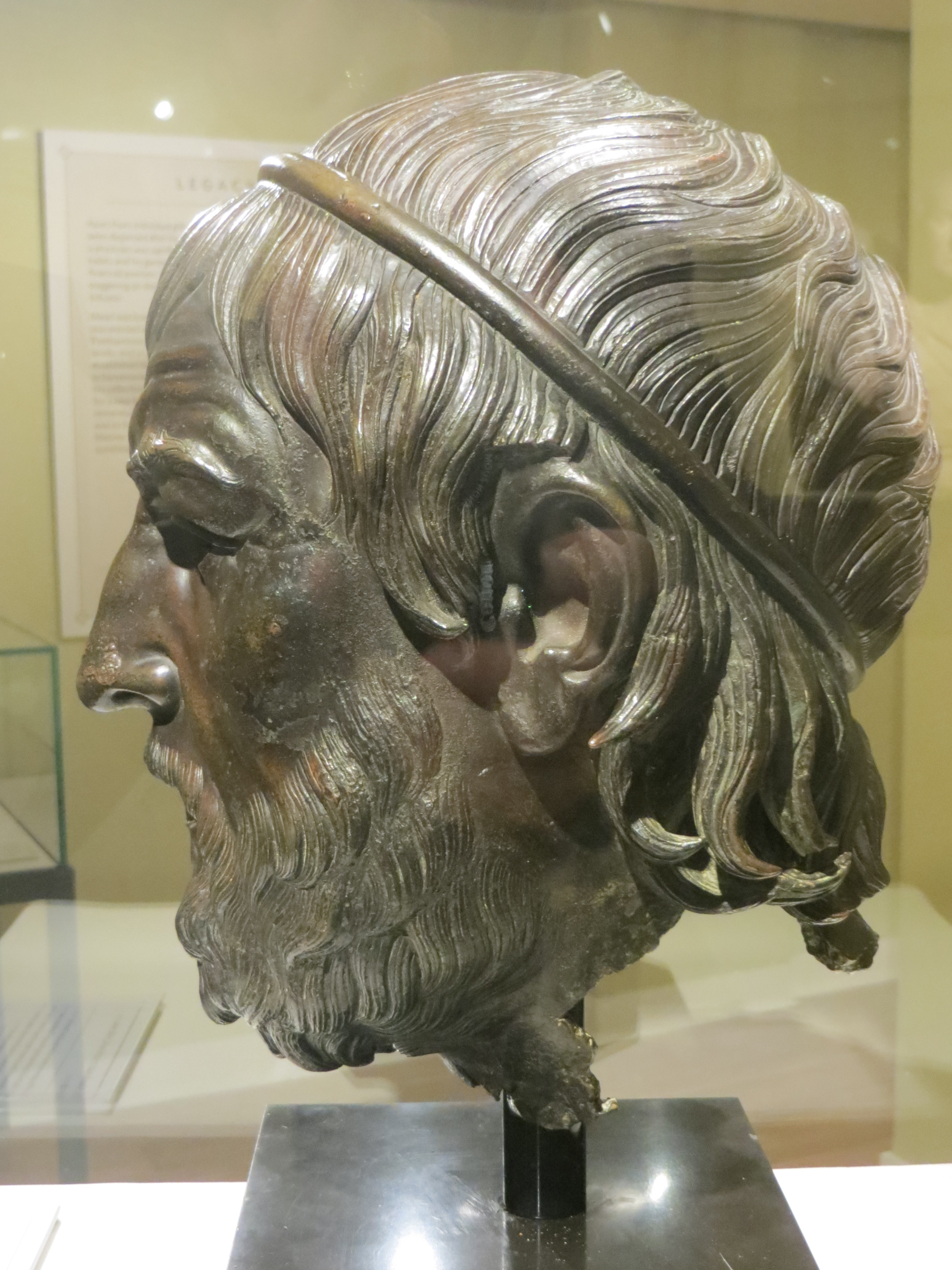
Side view of the head
