= Oglethorpe (surname) =

Oglethorpe is an English surname. Notable people with the surname include:

- Anne Oglethorpe (1683–1756), British Jacobite agent
- Eleanor Oglethorpe (1662–1732, born as Eleanor Wall), Irish Jacobite agent
- Eleanor Oglethorpe de Mézières (1684–1775), English-French Jacobite
- James Oglethorpe (1696–1785), British Army general and founder of the Georgia colony
- Lewis Oglethorpe (1681–1704), English politician and soldier
- Owen Oglethorpe (c.1502–1559), English bishop
- Theophilus Oglethorpe, Jr. (1684–1737), British politician

== See also ==
- Oglethorpe (disambiguation)
