= Jacobite peerage =

Peers created by King James VII & II in Britain

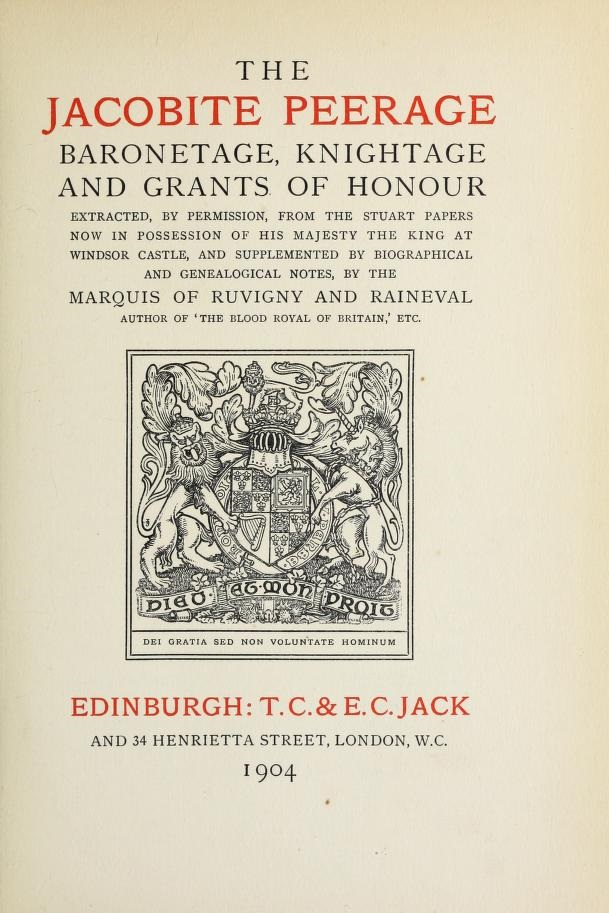
Title page of The Jacobite Peerage, 1904, by Marquis of Ruvigny and Raineval

The Jacobite peerage includes those peerages created by James II and VII, and the subsequent Jacobite pretenders, after James's deposition from the thrones of England, Scotland and Ireland following the Glorious Revolution of 1688. These creations were not recognised in English, Scots or Irish law, but the titles were used in Jacobite circles in Continental Europe and recognised by France, Spain and the Papacy.

Jacobite peerages ceased to be created after 1760 except for a title created by the "Young Pretender", Prince Charles Edward Stuart, for his illegitimate daughter in or before 1783. The following tables list the peerages and baronetcies created by the Stuart claimants in exile.

== Sources ==
An authoritative list of the Jacobite peerage does not exist. The standard source relied on is The Jacobite Peerage, Baronetage, Knightage and Grants of Honour published in 1904 by Melville Henry Massue, who called himself 'Marquis de Ruvigny et Raineval'. However, as a source, it is unreliable. Peter Drummond-Murray of Mastrick noted in an article in Burke's Peerage that:

[Ruvigny's] own pedigree was false, as was his claim to the French titles he used. This lack of integrity, unhappily, destroys much of the authority of one who was a gifted, if eccentric, genealogist. Much work still needs to be done on the Jacobite peerages, baronetcies, knighthoods and Lettres de Noblesse.

== Dukes ==
| Title | Date of creation | Surname | Current status | Peerage | Notes | Current holder (if any) |
|---|---|---|---|---|---|---|
| Duke of Powis | 12 January 1689 | Herbert | extinct 8 March 1748 | England | for William Herbert, 1st Marquess of Powis | |
| Duke of Albemarle | 13 January 1696 | FitzJames | extinct 27 December 1702 | England | for Henry FitzJames, an illegitimate son of King James II and VII. He also bore the title of Grand Prior of England. | |
| Duke of Northumberland | 22 December 1716 | Wharton | extinct 31 May 1731 | England | for Philip Wharton, 6th Baron Wharton (2nd Marquess of Wharton) | |
| Duke of Albemarle | 3 November 1721 | Granville | extinct 2 July 1776 | England | for George Granville (1st Baron Lansdowne) | |
| Duke of Arran | 2 January 1722 | Butler | extinct 17 December 1758 | England | for Charles Butler (1st Earl of Arran), also 3rd Duke of Ormonde from 16 November 1745 | |
| Duke of Strafford | 5 January 1722 | Wentworth | extinct 10 March 1791 | England | for Thomas Wentworth, 3rd Baron Raby (1st Earl of Strafford) | |
| Duke of York | shortly after 6 March 1725 | Stuart | merged in the crown 31 January 1788 | England | for Henry, younger son of James Francis Edward Stuart | |
| Duke of Melfort | 17 April 1692 | Drummond | extinct or dormant since 28 February 1902 | Scotland | for John Drummond, 1st Earl of Melfort, holder also Duke of Perth from 2 July 1800 until extinction | |
| Duke of Perth | before 17 October 1701 | Drummond | extant | Scotland | for James Drummond, 4th Earl of Perth, also Duke of Melfort from 2 July 1800 to 28 February 1902 | James David Drummond, 16th Duke of Perth (b. 1965) |
| Duke of Mar | 22 October 1715 | Erskine | extant | Scotland | for John Erskine, Earl of Mar | Margaret of Mar, 11th Duchess of Mar (b. 1940) |
| Duke of Rannoch | 1 February 1717 | Murray | extant | Scotland | for William, Earl of Tullibardine (Marquess of Tullibardine, and after 9 July 1724 2nd Duke of Atholl, by which title he was known among Jacobites, and even by James Francis Edward Stuart) | Bruce George Ronald Murray, 12th Duke of Rannoch (b. 1960) |
| Duke of St Andrews and Castelblanco | 4 February 1717 | de Rozas | dormant | Scotland | for José de Rozas, Count of Castelblanco, son-in-law of the 1st Duke of Melfort | |
| Duke of Inverness | 4 April 1727 | Hay | extinct 1740 | Scotland | for John Hay of Cromlix, 1st Earl of Inverness | |
| Duke of Fraser | 14 March 1740 | Fraser | extinct 8 December 1815 | Scotland | for Simon Fraser, 11th Lord Lovat | |
| Duchess of Albany | 24 March 1783 or before | Stuart | extinct 14 November 1789 | Scotland | for Charlotte Stuart, illegitimate daughter of Charles Edward Stuart by Clementina Walkinshaw | |
| Duke of Tyrconnell | 30 March 1689 | Talbot | extinct 14 August 1691 | Ireland | for Richard Talbot, 1st Earl of Tyrconnell | |
| Duke of Mar | 13 December 1722 | Erskine | extinct 16 March 1766 | Ireland | also Duke of Mar in Scotland | |

== Marquesses ==
| Title | Date of creation | Surname | Current status | Peerage | Notes | Current courtesy title-holder |
|---|---|---|---|---|---|---|
| Marquess of Montgomery | 12 January 1689 | Herbert | extinct 22 October 1745 | England | subsidiary title of the Duke of Powis | |
| Marquess of Trelissick | 20 June 1715 | Paynter | extinct 18th century | England | for James Paynter, Cornish gentleman. | |
| Marquess of Woburn | 22 December 1716 | Wharton | extinct 31 May 1731 | England | subsidiary title of the Duke of Northumberland | |
| Marquess Monck and Fitzhemon | 3 November 1721 | Granville | extinct 2 July 1776 | England | subsidiary title of the Duke of Albemarle | |
| Marquess of Seaforth | circa 1690 | Mackenzie | extinct 11 January 1815 | Scotland | for Kenneth Mackenzie, 4th Earl of Seaforth | |
| Marquess of Forth | 17 April 1692 | Drummond | extinct 28 February 1902 | Scotland | subsidiary title of the Duke of Melfort | |
| Marquess of Drummond | before 17 October 1701 | Drummond | extant | Scotland | subsidiary title of the Duke of Perth | None – current Duke of Perth has no sons |
| Marquess of Kenmure | 1707 | Gordon | dormant | Scotland | for William Gordon, 6th Viscount of Kenmure | |
| Marquess of Stirling | 22 October 1715 | Erskine | extant | Scotland | subsidiary title of the Duke of Mar. This Marquessate is sometimes recorded as "Marquess Erskine" | None – current Duchess of Mar has no sons |
| Marquess of Blair | 1 February 1717 | Murray | extant | Scotland | subsidiary title of the Duke of Rannoch | Michael Bruce John Murray, Marquess of Blair (b. 1985) |
| Marquess of Borland | 4 February 1717 | de Rozas | dormant | Scotland | subsidiary title of the Duke of St Andrews and Castelblanco | |
| Marquess of Beaufort | 14 March 1740 | Fraser | extinct 8 December 1815 | Scotland | subsidiary title of the Duke of Fraser | |
| Marquess of Tyrconnell | 30 March 1689 | Talbot | extinct 14 August 1691 | Ireland | subsidiary title of the Duke of Tyrconnell | |

== Earls ==
| Title | Date of creation | Surname | Current status | Notes | Peerage | Current holder (if any)(non-subsidiary earldoms only) |
|---|---|---|---|---|---|---|
| Earl of Dover | July 1689 | Jermyn | extinct 6 April 1708 | England | for Henry Jermyn, 1st Baron Dover, also 1st Baron Dover and 3rd Baron Jermyn of St. Edmundsbury | |
| Earl of Portland | 1690 | Herbert | extinct 5 November 1698 | England | for Sir Edward Herbert, Chief Justice of the King's Bench during the reign of James II | |
| Earl of Tenterden | 3 May 1692 | Hales | dormant | England | for Sir Edward Hales, 3rd Baronet | |
| Earl of Rochford | 13 January 1696 | FitzJames | extinct 27 December 1702 | England | subsidiary title of the Duke of Albemarle | |
| Earl of Monmouth | between 16 September and 17 October 1701 | Middleton | extinct February 1747 | England | for Charles Middleton, 2nd Earl of Middleton in the Peerage of Scotland, Secretary of State to King James II & VII and James Francis Edward Stuart | |
| Earl of Bolingbroke | 26 July 1715 | St John | extinct 12 December 1751 | England | for Henry St. John, Secretary of State of Anne, Queen of Great Britain, by whom he was created Viscount Bolingbroke and St John in 1712 | |
| Earl of Macclesfield | 1716 | Dorrington | extinct 1841 | England | for William Dorington or Dorrington, Colonel of the King's Royal Irish Regiment of Foot Guards | |
| Countess of Jersey | April 1716 | Villiers | extinct circa 1735 | England | title granted for life to Barbara, née Chiffinch, widow of Edward Villiers, 1st Earl of Jersey | |
| Earl of Jersey | April 1716 | Villiers | extant | England | for William Villiers, 2nd Earl of Jersey, holder of the Earldom of Jersey created by William III in 1697 | William Villiers, 9th Earl of Jersey (b. 1976) |
| Earl of Malmesbury | 22 December 1716 | Wharton | extinct 31 May 1731 | England | subsidiary title of the Duke of Northumberland | |
| Earl of Mar | 10 November 1717 | Erskine | extinct 16 March 1766 | England | also Duke of Mar in Scotland | |
| Earl of Chester | shortly after 31 December 1720 | Stuart | merged in the crown 1 January 1766 | England | subsidiary title of Charles Edward Stuart | |
| Earl of Bath | 6 October 1721 | Granville | dormant 2 July 1776 | England | also Duke of Albemarle from 3 November 1721 | |
| Earl of Bath | 3 November 1721 | Granville | extinct 2 July 1776 | England | subsidiary title of the Duke of Albemarle | |
| Earl North | 6 January 1722 | North | extinct upon the death of the grantee 31 March 1734 | England | for William North, 6th Baron North of Kirleton and 2nd Baron Grey of Rolleston. Appointed by James Francis Edward Stuart Lieutenant-General (2 January 1722), Commander-in-Chief, City of London and Westminster (5 January 1722), one of the nine Lords Regent (26 May 1722) | |
| Earl of Falkland | 13 December 1722 | Cary | extant | England | for Lucius Cary, 6th Viscount Falkland | Lucius Cary, 10th Earl of Falkland (b. 1935) |
| Earl of Westminster | 12 August 1759 | Murray | extant | England | for Alexander Murray of Elibank, 4th son of 4th Lord Elibank | Robert Francis Alan Erskine-Murray, 12th Earl of Westminster (b. 1964) |
| Countess of Almond | 13 January 1689 | Davia-Montecuculi | extinct April 1703 | Scotland | title for life, created for Donna Anna Victoria Davia Montecuculi, who accompanied the Queen on her escape from Whitehall on 9 December 1688 | |
| Earl of Fortrose | circa 1690 | Mackenzie | extinct 11 January 1815 | Scotland | subsidiary title of the Marquess of Seaforth | |
| Earl of Isla and Burntisland | 17 April 1692 | Drummond | extinct 28 February 1902 | Scotland | subsidiary title of the Duke of Melfort | |
| Earl of Almond | 12 April 1698 | Davia | extant Italian family descendant from Davia | Scotland | for Virgilio Davia, the husband of the Countess of Almond, above | |
| Earl of Stobhall | before 17 October 1701 | Drummond | extant | Scotland | subsidiary title of the Duke of Perth | N/A – current Duke of Perth has no sons |
| Earl of Dundee | shortly before 12 November 1705 | Gualterio | extant | Scotland | for John Baptist/Giovanni Battista Gualterio, brother of Cardinal Filippo Antonio Gualterio, Cardinal Protector of Scotland, as of 1706, and England, as of 1717, "to secure political support at Rome". Giovanni Battista was also Marquis of Corgnolo, near Orvieto (created 1723, Pope Innocent XIII), patrician of Rome and Orvieto, noble of Viterbo and Loreto; between 1713 and 1720, also Duke of Cumia, near Messina (created by Philip V of Spain) | |
| Earl of Kildrummie | 22 October 1715 | Erskine | extant | Scotland | subsidiary title of the Duke of Mar | None – current Duchess of Mar has no male-line grandsons |
| Earl of Glen Tilt | 1 February 1717 | Murray | extant | Scotland | subsidiary title of the Duke of Rannoch | N/A – current courtesy Marquess of Blair has no sons |
| Earl of Fordan | 4 February 1717 | de Rozas | dormant | Scotland | subsidiary title of the Duke of St Andrews and Castelblanco | |
| Earl of Inverness | 5 October 1718 | Hay | extinct 1740 | Scotland | for John Hay of Cromlix, also Duke of Inverness from 4 April 1727 | |
| Earl of Dunbar | 2 February 1721 | Murray | extant | Scotland | for James Murray, younger son of David Murray, 5th Viscount of Stormont. Creation assumed to be with remainder to heirs male of his brothers; from 20 March 1793 claim inherited by Earls of Mansfield (cr. 1792 by George III) | Alexander David Mungo Murray, 9th Earl of Dunbar (b. 1956) |
| Earl of Dillon | 24 June 1721 | Dillon | extant | Scotland | for Arthur Dillon, also Viscount Dillon of Costello Gallen in the peerage of Ireland (created 1622) from February 1737 | Henry Benedict Charles Dillon, 14th Earl of Dillon (b. 1973) |
| Earl of Nairne | 24 June 1721 | Murray | extant | Scotland | for William Murray, 2nd Lord Nairne (cr. 1681). From 7 December 1837, also Earl of Dunmore (cr. 1686) | Malcolm Murray, 12th Earl of Nairne (b. 1946) |
| Earl of Stratherrick and Upper Tarf | 14 March 1740 | Fraser | extinct 8 December 1815 | Scotland | subsidiary title of the Duke of Fraser | |
| Earl of Alford | 20 January 1760 | Graeme | extinct 3 January 1773 | Scotland | for John Graeme, Jacobite Minister at Vienna and subsequently Secretary of State | |
| Earl of Lucan | January 1691 | Sarsfield | extinct 12 May 1719 | Ireland | for Patrick Sarsfield, Jacobite leader in the Williamite War in Ireland | |
| Earl of Newcastle | 1692 | Butler | extinct 18 June 1740 | Ireland | also Viscount Galmoye in the peerage of Ireland. | |
| Countess Oglethorpe of Oglethorpe | 9 November 1722 | Oglethorpe | extinct 1756 | Ireland | for Anne Oglethorpe, Jacobite agent who worked to restore James II and James Francis Edward Stuart | |
| Earl of Browne | 12 April 1726 | Browne | extinct 19 December 1803 | Ireland | for General George Browne, also Count von Browne of the Holy Roman Empire. | |
| Earl of Moenmoyne | 1746 | Lally | extinct 11 March 1830 | Ireland | for Thomas Arthur, comte de Lally, general in the Jacobite rising of 1745 | |
| Earl Walsh | 20 October 1745 | Walsh | extinct 26 October 1884 | Ireland | for Anthony Vincent Walsh, shipbuilder at Nantes. | |
| Earl of Lismore | 11 October 1746 | O'Brien | extinct before 1789 | Ireland | for Daniel O'Brien, Jacobite envoy and Secretary of State. | |

== Viscounts ==
| Title | Date of creation | Surname | Current status | Notes | Peerage | Current holder (if any) substantive and courtesy |
|---|---|---|---|---|---|---|
| Viscount Cheveley | 9 July 1689 | Jermyn | extinct 6 April 1708 | subsidiary title of the Earl of Dover | England | |
| Viscount Tunstall | 3 May 1692 | Hales | extinct 15 March 1829 | subsidiary title of the Earl of Tenterden | England | |
| Viscount Clermont | between 16 September and 17 October 1701 | Middleton | extinct February 1747 | subsidiary title of the Earl of Monmouth | England | |
| Viscount Dartford | April 1716 | Villiers | extant | subsidiary title of the Earl of Jersey | England | George Henry William Child-Villiers, Viscount Dartford (b. 2015) (courtesy peer) |
| Viscount Winchendon | 22 December 1716 | Wharton | extinct 31 May 1731 | subsidiary title of the Duke of Northumberland | England | |
| Viscount Bevel | 3 November 1721 | Granville | extinct 2 July 1776 | subsidiary title of the Duke of Albemarle | England | |
| Viscount Goring | 2 January 1722 | Goring | extant | for Sir Henry Goring, 4th Baronet, regrant 1678 with precedence 14 May 1622 | England | Richard Harry Goring, 11th Viscount Goring |
| Viscount of Rickerton | 17 April 1692 | Drummond | extinct 28 February 1902 | subsidiary title of the Duke of Melfort | Scotland | |
| Viscount of Moneydie | 12 April 1698 | Davia | unknown | subsidiary title of the Earl of Almond | Scotland | |
| Viscount Cargill | before 17 October 1701 | Drummond | extant | subsidiary title of the Duke of Perth | Scotland | N/A – current Duke of Perth has no grandsons |
| Viscount Gualterio | shortly before 12 November 1705 | Gualterio | extant | subsidiary title of the Earl of Dundee | Scotland | |
| Viscount of Garioch | 22 October 1715 | Erskine | extant | subsidiary title of the Duke of Mar | Scotland | None – current Duchess of Mar has no male-line great-grandsons |
| Viscount of Glenshie | 1 February 1717 | Murray | extant | subsidiary title of the Duke of Rannoch | Scotland | N/A – current courtesy Marquess of Blair has no grandsons |
| Viscount of The Bass | 4 February 1717 | de Rozas | dormant | subsidiary title of the Duke of St Andrews and Castelblanco | Scotland | |
| Viscount of Innerpaphrie | 5 October 1718 | Hay | extinct 1740 | subsidiary title of the Earl of Inverness | Scotland | |
| Viscount of Drumcairn | 2 February 1721 | Murray | extant | subsidiary title of the Earl of Dunbar | Scotland | William Philip David Mungo Murray, Viscount of Drumcairn (b. 1988) (courtesy peer) |
| Viscount of Stanley | 24 June 1721 | Murray | extant | subsidiary title of the Earl of Nairne | Scotland | Charles Benjimen Murray b.Feb 23 1982 |
| Viscount of the Aird and Strathglass | 14 March 1740 | Fraser | extinct 8 December 1815 | subsidiary title of the Duke of Fraser | Scotland | |
| Viscount of Falkirk | 20 January 1760 | Graeme | extinct 3 January 1773 | subsidiary title of the Earl of Alford | Scotland | |
| Viscount Mountcashell | 1 May 1689 | MacCarthy | extinct 1 July 1694 | for Lieutenant-General Justin MacCarthy | Ireland | |
| Viscount Kenmare | 20 May 1689 | Browne | extinct 1952 | for Sir Valentine Browne, 3rd Baronet, also Baronet of Killarney, County Kerry (created 1622 by King James I) | Ireland | |
| Viscount Mount Leinster | 23 August 1689 | Chevers | extinct 1709 | for Edward Chevers, aide-de-camp to King James II at the Battle of the Boyne, brother-in-law of Patrick Sarsfield, Earl of Lucan (q.v.) | Ireland | |
| Viscount Cahiravahilla | 1689 or 1690 | Roche | either extinct 5 June 1807, or dormant | for Dominick Roche, Mayor of Limerick, who died in 1701; his sons appear to have let it lapse | Ireland | |
| Viscount of Tully | January 1691 | Sarsfield | extinct 12 May 1719 | subsidiary title of the Earl of Lucan | Ireland | |
| Viscount Dillon | 1 February 1717 | Dillon | extant | elevated to Earl of Dillon,1721 (q.v.) in the Peerage of Scotland | Ireland | N/A – identical to earldom |
| Viscount Everard | 20 June 1723 | Everard | extinct 1740 | for Sir Redmond Everard, 4th Baronet | Ireland | |
| Viscount Breffney | 31 July 1731 | O'Rourke | extinct on the death of the grantee | for Owen (or Audeonus or Eugenius) O'Rourke, Ambassador of James Francis Edward Stuart to the Imperial Court at Vienna | Ireland | |
| Viscount Breffney | July 1742 | O'Rourke | dormant since the 18th century | see above. New patent with precedence of former grant, with remainder to his cousin Constantine O'Rourke, Count of the Russian Empire, and the heirs male of his body | Ireland | |
| Viscount Ballymole | 1746 | Lally | extinct 11 March 1830 | subsidiary title of the Earl of Moenmoyne | Ireland | |
| Viscount Tallow | 11 October 1746 | O'Brien | extinct before 1789 | subsidiary title of the Earl of Lismore | Ireland | |

== Barons and Lords of Parliament ==
=== Barons in the peerage of England ===
| Title | Date of creation | Surname | Current status | Notes |
|---|---|---|---|---|
| Baron of Esk | 21 January 1689 | Graham | extinct 1739 | for Richard Graham, 1st Viscount Preston of Haddington in the peerage of Scotland (cr. 1681) |
| Baron Jermyn | 9 July 1689 | Jermyn | extinct 6 April 1708 | subsidiary title of the Earl of Dover |
| Baron Ipswich | 9 July 1689 | Jermyn | extinct 6 April 1708 | subsidiary title of the Earl of Dover |
| Baron Cleworth | 7 August 1689 | Drummond | extinct 28 February 1902 | also Earl of Melfort in Scotland, Duke of Melfort from 17 April 1692 and Duke of Perth from 2 July 1800 |
| Baron Hales | 3 May 1692 | Hales | extinct 15 March 1829 | subsidiary title of the Earl of Tenterden |
| Baron Romney | 13 January 1696 | FitzJames | extinct 17 December 1702 | subsidiary title of the Duke of Albemarle |
| Baron Caryll of Durford | Before 29 January 1698 | Caryll | extinct 1788 | for John Caryll, poet, dramatist and diplomat |
| Baron Hoo | April 1716 | Villiers | extant | subsidiary title of the Earl of Jersey |
| Baron Cottington | April 1716 | Cottington | extinct 1758 | for Francis Cottington of Fonthill Gifford |
| Baron Oglethorpe | 20 December 1717 | Oglethorpe | extinct 1 July 1785 | for Theophilus Oglethorpe, Jr., former Member of Parliament for Haslemere under Anne, Queen of Great Britain |
| Baron Lansdowne | 6 October 1721 | Granville | dormant 2 July 1776 | subsidiary title of the Earl of Bath |
| Baron Lansdown | 3 November 1721 | Granville | extinct 2 July 1776 | subsidiary title of the Duke of Albemarle |
| Baron Bullinghel | 2 January 1722 | Goring | extant | subsidiary title of the Viscount Goring |
| Baron Hay | 3 April 1727 | Hay | extinct 1740 | also Earl of Inverness in Scotland, Duke of Inverness from 4 April 1727 |

=== Lords of Parliament in the peerage of Scotland ===
| Title | Date of creation | Surname | Current status | Notes | Current holder (if any)(non-subsidiary titles only) | Heir (non-subsidiary titles only) |
|---|---|---|---|---|---|---|
| Lord Castlemains and Galston | 17 April 1692 | Drummond | extinct 28 February 1902 | subsidiary title of the Duke of Melfort | | |
| Lord Davia | 12 April 1698 | Davia | unknown | subsidiary title of the Earl of Almond | | |
| Lord Concraig | before 17 October 1701 | Drummond | extant | subsidiary title of the Duke of Perth | | |
| Lord Sempill of Dykehead | 11 May 1712 | Sempill | dormant | for Robert Sempill, an heir of the Lords Sempill and soldier in French service | | |
| Lord Alloa, Ferriton and Forrest | 22 October 1715 | Erskine | extant | subsidiary title of the Duke of Mar | | |
| Lady Clanranald | 28 September 1716 | Mackenzie | extinct 1743 | for Penelope Louisa Mackenzie, widow of Allan Macdonald, 14th Chief of Clanranald | | |
| Lord of Clanranald | 28 September 1716 | Macdonald of Clanranald | extant | for Ranald MacDonald of Clanranald, younger son of Donald Macdonald of Clanranald | Ranald Alexander Macdonald, 10th Lord of Clanranald, 24th Chief and Captain of Clanranald – one of the MacDonalds of Boisdale – inherited titles in 1944 following the death of Angus Roderick, 9th Lord of Clanranald, 23rd Chief and Captain of Clanranald | Ranald 'Og' Angus Macdonald of Clanranald, younger, Master of Clanranald (b. 1963) |
| Lord MacLeod | 8 December 1716 | MacLeod of MacLeod | extant | for Norman MacLeod, 19th/22nd Chief of Clan MacLeod | Present holder uncertain since the death of Sir Reginald Macleod, KCB, 27th Chief of Macleod and titular 8th Lord Macleod (leaving two daughters, the elder of whom succeeded him in the name of Macleod) | |
| Lord MacDonell | 9 December 1716 | MacDonell of Glengarry | extant | for Alastair Dubh MacDonell, or MacDonald, 11th Chief of Glengarry, attainted 1690, fought at Sherriffmuir, again attainted 1716, died 1724 | Aeneas Ranald Euan MacDonell, 13th Lord MacDonnell (b. 1941) | |
| Lord Maclean | 17 December 1716 | Maclean | extant | for Sir Hector Maclean, 5th Baronet, of Morvaren (or Morvern) in the County of Argyll, in the Baronetage of Nova Scotia created on 3 September 1631 | Lachlan Maclean, 8th Lord Maclean (b. 1942) | Malcolm Lachlan Charles Maclean, Master of Maclean (b. 1972) |
| Lord Sleat | 23 December 1716 | MacDonald | extant | for Sir Donald Macdonald, 4th Baronet, Macdonald of Sleat in the Isle of Skye in the Baronetage of Nova Scotia, created 28 May 1625 (Titular "Baron Macdonald of Slate" in the County of Antrim in the Peerage of Ireland, created 1776, between 1776 and 1832) | Ian Godfrey Bosville Macdonald, 14th Lord of Sleat (b. 1947) | Somerled Alexander Bosville Macdonald, Master of Sleat (b. 1976) |
| Lord Lochiel | 27 January 1717 | Chief of Cameron | extant | for Sir Ewen Cameron and then John Cameron of Lochiel, 18th Chief of Clan Cameron | Donald Andrew Cameron, 10th Lord Lochiel | Donald Andrew John Cameron, younger of Lochiel, Master of Lochiel (b. 1976) |
| Lord Strathbran | 1 February 1717 | Murray | extant | subsidiary title of the Duke of Rannoch | | |
| Lord Divron | 4 February 1717 | de Rozas | dormant | subsidiary title of the Duke of St Andrews and Castelblanco | | |
| Lord Cromlix and Erne | 5 October 1718 | Hay | extinct 1740 | subsidiary title of the Earl of Inverness | | |
| Lord Mackintosh | 21 January 1721 | Mackintosh of Mackintosh | extant | for Lachlan Mackintosh, 20th chief of Clan Mackintosh | John Lachlan Mackintosh, 11th Lord Mackintosh | |
| Lord Hadykes | 2 February 1721 | Murray | extant | subsidiary title of the Earl of Dunbar | | |
| Lord Grant | 24 June 1721 | Grant of Grant | extant | for Sir James Grant, the Chief of Clan Grant, also 6th baronet Colquhoun of Colquhoun of Nova Scotia (cr. 1625), who subsequently supported the House of Hanover. From 5 October 1811, the 4th Lord Grant and 9th baronet of Colquhoun, succeeded as 5th Earl of Seafield, Viscount of Reidhaven and Lord Ogilvie of Deskford and Cullen (cr. 1701 by William III, which titles remained united with the Lordship of Grant until 12 November 1915, when the honours of Lord Grant and Chief of Clan Grant, together with the baronetcy of Colquhoun, passed to the 4th Baron Strathspey of Strathspey (cr. 1884 by Queen Victoria) and his heirs | James Patrick Trevor Grant of Grant, 13th Lord Grant | Michael Patrick Grant of Grant, Master of Grant (b. 1953) |
| Lord Fraser | 20 July 1723 | Fraser | extant | for Charles Fraser of Inverallochy – from 13 December 1792, this title was inherited by the 3rd Duke of Fraser and upon the extinction of the Dukedom of Fraser, 8 December 1815, passed to the 14th Lord Lovat and his heirs | Simon Fraser, 18th Lord Lovat and 8th Lord Fraser | Jack Fraser, Master of Lovat and Fraser (b. 1984) |
| Lord Lovat and Beauly | 14 March 1740 | Fraser | extinct 8 December 1815 | subsidiary title of the Duke of Fraser | | |
| Lord Appin | 6 June 1743 | Stewart of Appin | extant | for Dugald Stewart, 9th Chief of Appin | Andrew Francis Stewart of Lorn, Appin and Ardsheal, 17th of Appin & 12th of Ardsheal (b. 1949) | |
| Lord Newton | 20 January 1760 | Graeme | extinct 3 January 1773 | subsidiary title of the Earl of Alford | | |
| Lord Oliphant | 1760 | Oliphant of Gask | extinct 1847 | for Laurence Oliphant, Jacobite army officer | | |

=== Barons in the peerage of Ireland ===
| Title | Date of creation | Surname | Current status | Notes |
|---|---|---|---|---|
| Baron Bourke of Bophin | 2 April 1689 | Bourke | extinct 12 April 1916 | also Earl of Clanricarde from 1702 |
| Baron Nugent of Riverston | 3 April 1689 | Nugent | extant | for Thomas Nugent, Lord Chief Justice of Ireland, holder also Earl of Westmeath from 1871 |
| Baron Castleinch | 1 May 1689 | MacCarty | extinct 1 July 1694 | subsidiary title of the Viscount Mountcashell |
| Baron Maguire of Enniskillen | 1 May 1689 | Maguire | extinct 1719 | for Roger Maguire, re-creation of the title Baron Maguire forfeit since 1645 |
| Baron Fitton of Gawsworth | 1 May 1689 | Fitton | extinct November 1698 | for Alexander Fitton who was Lord Chancellor of Ireland 1687–1690 |
| Baron Castlerosse | 20 May 1689 | Browne | extinct 1952 | subsidiary title of the Viscount Kenmare |
| Baron Bannow | 23 August 1689 | Chevers | extinct 1709 | subsidiary title of the Viscount Mount Leinster |
| Baron Tarbert | 1689 or 1690 | Roche | extinct 5 June 1807 | subsidiary title of the Viscount Cahiravahilla |
| Baron Loughmore | 1690 | Purcell | extant | for Nicholas Purcell of Loughmoe, Colonel of a regiment of horse in James II's army – also Baron of Loughmoe (created 1328) |
| Baron Rosberry | January 1691 | Sarsfield | extinct 12 May 1719 | subsidiary title of the Earl of Lucan |
| Baron Hooke of Hooke Castle | 19 February 1708 | Hooke | extinct 20 August 1744 | for Colonel Nathaniel Hooke, special envoy of James Francis Edward Stuart and later of Louis XIV of France to prepare abortive Jacobite rising in 1708 |
| Baron Redmond | 15 December 1721 | Redmond | extinct before 26 March 1732 | for Sir Peter Redmond, knight of the Order of Christ, created a baronet 1717 (q.v.) |
| Baron McMahon | 19 January 1723 | McMahon | unknown | for Colonel Donald McMahon of Monaghan |
| Baron Castle Lyons | 17 March 1726 | O'Brien | extinct before 1789 | also Earl of Lismore from 11 October 1746 |
| Baron Bourke | 3 February 1727 | Bourke | unknown | for Toby (Theobald) Bourke, diplomat, descended from the Bourkes of Clanricarde |
| Baron Butler | 1 April 1727 | Butler | unknown | for Richard Butler |
| Baron O'Rourke | 18 April 1727 | O'Rourke | extinct on the death of the grantee | for Owen (or Audeonus or Eugenius) O'Rourke of Carha, Ambassador of James Francis Edward Stuart to the Imperial Court at Vienna in 1741 - also Viscount Breffney from 31 July 1731 |
| Baron Crone | 16 February 1728 | Crone | unknown | for Matthew Crone |
| Baron Carha | July 1742 | O'Rourke | dormant since the 18th century | subsidiary title of the Viscount Breffney |
| Baron Tollendally | 1746 | Lally | extinct 11 March 1830 | subsidiary title of the Earl of Moenmoyne |

== Baronets ==
=== Baronets of England ===
| Surname | Date of creation | Current status | Notes |
|---|---|---|---|
| Ashton | 8 November 1692 | unknown | for the son and heir of John Ashton (died 1691) |
| Ronchi | 24 July 1715 | unknown | for Conte Giacomo (James) Ronchi, Almoner to Queen Mary at St Germain |
| Redmond | 20 December 1717 | extinct before 26 March 1732 | also Baron Redmond in the peerage of Ireland from 15 December 1721 |
| Ronchi | 5 October 1722 | unknown | for Joseph Ronchi |
| Connock | 22 February 1732 | unknown | for William Connock, father of Sir Timon Connock, aide-de-camp to Philip V |
| Constable | 17 September 1753 | unknown | for John Constable, for service to Henry Benedict Stuart |

=== Baronets of Nova Scotia ===
| Surname | Date of creation | Current status | Notes |
|---|---|---|---|
| Nairne of Sandfurd | 7 February 1719 | extinct after January 1740 | for David Nairne, Under Secretary of State, 1689–1713 (with intervals), Clerk of the King's Council, 1706–1713, Secretary of the Closet, 1713–1733 |
| MacLeod | 5 September 1723 | extant | |
| Robertson of Struan | 1725 | extant | for Alexander Robertson of Struan, 13th Chief of Clan Donnachaidh and the only man to take part in all three Jacobite uprisings |
| Robertson of Fascally | 10 May 1725 | extinct in the 18th century | for Alexander Robertson of Fascally |
| Graeme | 6 September 1726 | extinct 3 January 1773 | also Earl of Alford from 20 January 1760 |
| Forrester (fforrester) | 31 March 1729 | unknown | |
| Ramsay | 23 March 1735 | extinct 6 May 1743 | for Andrew Michael Ramsay, known as the "Chevalier Ramsay", leading exponent of Scottish Freemasonry |
| Lumisden | 5 January 1740 | extinct 1751 | for John Lumisden (or Lumsden), cousin of Andrew Lumisden |
| MacGregor | 14 March 1740 | unknown | for Alexander MacGregor Drummond of Balhaldie, elected Chief of Clan Gregor and a distinguished Jacobite |
| Macdonald (or MacDonnell) of Keppoch | 6 June 1743 | dormant since 1838 | for Alexander Macdonald, 17th of Keppoch |
| Hay | 31 January 1747 | unknown | |
| Edgar of Keithock | 1759 | Extinct 1925 | for John Edgar of Keithock, nephew of James Edgar, Clerk of the Rolls, Register and Council in Scotland |
| Hay of Restalrig | 31 December 1766 | extant | for John Hay of Restalrig, Major-Domo of the Household of Charles Edward Stuart in Rome |
| Stewart | 4 November 1784 | unknown | for Sir John Stewart, Head of Charles's household. Stewart married Rosa Fiorani. Their son Charles Stewart, an officer in the Papal army, died in 1864 and is buried in San Lorenzo in Lucina |

=== Baronets of Ireland ===
| Surname | Date of creation | Current status | Notes |
|---|---|---|---|
| Lally | 7 July 1707 | extinct 11 March 1830 | also Earl of Moenmoyne from 1746 |
| Sherlock | 9 December 1716 | unknown | for Sir Peter Sherlock, father of John Sherlock |
| Wogan | June 1719 | unknown | for Charles Wogan |
| Higgins | 6 May 1724 | unknown | for Dr John Higgins of Montoge |
| Sheridan | 17 March 1726 | extinct 1746 | for Thomas Sheridan |
| O'Gara | 2 May 1727 | extinct 1776 | for Oliver O'Gara |
| Hely | 28 June 1728 | unknown | for Sir John Hely |
| Worth | 12 September 1733 | unknown | for Patrick Worth |
| Forstal | 22 January 1734 | unknown | for Mark Forstal |
| Gaydon | 29 July 1743 | unknown | for Richard Gaydon |
| Butler | 23 December 1743 | unknown | for Piers Butler |
| Warren | 3 November 1746 | extinct 21 June 1775 | for Colonel Richard Warren |
| Rutledge | 23 December 1748 | unknown | for Walter Rutledge |
| O'Sullivan | 9 May 1753 | extinct 24 March 1895 | for John William O'Sullivan |

== Knights of the Garter and Knights of the Thistle ==
=== Knights of the Most Noble Order of the Garter ===
| Name | Date of creation | Notes |
|---|---|---|
| Richard Talbot, Duke of Tyrconnell | November 1690 | |
| James, Prince of Wales, Duke of Cornwall and Rothesay | 19 April 1692 | Succeeded as Sovereign of the Order, 16 September 1701 |
| William Herbert, 1st Duke of Powis | 19 April 1692 | |
| John Drummond, 1st Duke of Melfort | 19 April 1692 | Created Knight of the Order of the Thistle, 1687 |
| Antoine Nompar de Caumont, marquis de Puyguilhem, duc de Lauzun | 19 April 1692 | Duke and Peer of France, Marshal of France. At the Court of King James II, 1685–1688, accompanied Queen Mary Beatrice and the Prince of Wales to France, December 1688. With King James II in Ireland, 1689–1691. Confidant of Queen Mary Beatrice after 1701. |
| Henry Fitz-James, Duke of Albemarle | 1696 | Grand Prior of the English Commandery of the Sovereign Military Hospitaller Order of Saint John of Jerusalem, of Rhodes and of Malta |
| James Drummond, 1st Duke of Perth | 21 June 1706 | Created Knight of the Order of the Thistle, 1687 |
| Piers Butler, 3rd Viscount of Galmoye, 1st Earl of Newcastle (in the Peerage of Ireland) | after 26 January 1715 | Nominated to succeed the Duke of Melfort (see above) |
| John Erskine, 1st Duke of Mar | 8 April 1716 | Created Knight of the Order of the Thistle by Anne, Queen of Great Britain, 1706. Degraded 1715 |
| Charles Edward, Prince of Wales, Duke of Cornwall and Rothesay | 25 December 1722 | Succeeded as Sovereign of the Order, 1 January 1766 |
| James Douglas-Hamilton, 5th Duke of Hamilton | 30 July 1723 | Created Knight of the Order of the Thistle by George I, 1726 |
| Philip Wharton, Duke of Northumberland | 5 March 1726 | |
| James Fitz-James Stuart, Earl of Tynemouth | 3 April 1727 | Succeeded as 2nd Duke of Berwick and 2nd Duque de Liria y Jérica, Grandee of Spain 1734 |
| Henry Benedict, Duke of York | Before 1729 | Cardinal of the Holy Roman Church, 1747. Succeeded as Sovereign of the Order, 31 January 1788 |
| Daniel O'Brien, 1st Earl of Lismore | November 1747 | |

=== Knights of the Most Ancient and Most Noble Order of the Thistle ===
| Name | Date of creation | Notes |
|---|---|---|
| James Prince of Wales, Duke of Cornwall and Rothesay | 1692 | Succeeded as Sovereign of the Order, 16 September 1701 |
| David Graham of Claverhouse, 3rd Viscount of Dundee | 1692 | |
| Richard Maitland, 4th Earl of Lauderdale | 1692 | |
| James Seton, 4th Earl of Dunfermline | 1692 | |
| James Drummond, Marquis of Drummond | March 1705 | Succeeded his father as 2nd Duke of Perth, 11 May 1716 |
| Charles Hay, 13th Earl of Erroll | March 1705 | |
| William Keith, 9th Earl Marischal | February 1708 | |
| Giovanni Battista Gualterio, 1st Earl of Dundee | 10 May 1708 | |
| James Butler, 2nd Duke of Ormonde, 3rd Lord Dingwall in the Peerage of Scotland | 8 April 1716 | Created Knight of the Garter by King James II, 1688. Degraded 1715 |
| James Maule, 4th Earl of Panmure | 8 April 1716 | |
| William Mackenzie, 2nd Marquess of Seaforth | Before December 1716 | |
| Arthur Dillon, 1st Viscount Dillon (I) and 1st Earl of Dillon (S) | 26 May 1722 | |
| Charles Edward, Prince of Wales, Duke of Cornwall and Rothesay | 25 December 1722 | Succeeded as Sovereign of the Order, 1 January 1766 |
| George Keith, 10th Earl Marischal | 29 December 1725 | |
| John Hay, 1st Earl and 1st Duke of Inverness | 31 December 1725 | |
| William Maxwell, 5th Earl of Nithsdale | 31 December 1725 | |
| James Murray, 1st Earl of Dunbar | 31 December 1725 | |
| James Drummond, 3rd Duke of Perth | 15 May 1739 | |
| James Douglas-Hamilton, 5th Duke of Hamilton | 27 July 1740 | Created Knight of the Garter, 1723 (see above) |
| Henry Benedict, Duke of York | Before 1742 | Succeeded as Sovereign of the Order, 31 January 1788 |
| John Caryll, 3rd Baron Caryll of Dunford (in the Peerage of England) | 1768 | Secretary of State of Charles Edward Stuart |
| Charlotte Stuart, Duchess of Albany | 30 November 1784 | Natural daughter of Charles Edward Stuart |
