= George Kelly (Jacobite) =

Irish cleric and Jacobite (c.1680–1762)

George Kelly (c. 1680 – October 1762) was an Irish clergyman and Jacobite. A close associate of Charles Edward Stuart, he is notable as one of the Seven Men of Moidart who accompanied Prince Charles to Scotland in July 1745 to initiate the Jacobite rising of that year.

== Early life ==
Kelly was born in County Roscommon, Ireland, the son of Edward Kelly. His family had longstanding connections with the Stuarts; Kelly's cousin and fellow Jacobite plotter, Captain Dennis Kelly, was the son of Charles Kelly of Screen, Galway, a veteran of the Williamite War in Ireland.

He entered Trinity College Dublin in 1702 and graduated in 1706, before being ordained as a deacon in the Church of Ireland. As a nonjuring priest, in 1718 he delivered a sermon which expressed sympathy for the exiled Stuart claimant to the throne, James Francis Edward Stuart. Kelly was expelled from his position and moved to Paris, where he was briefly involved in the Mississippi Company.

== Jacobite agent ==
He returned to London in 1721 and became chaplain to Francis Atterbury, a Jacobite bishop in the Church of England. Under the alias of 'James Johnson', Kelly became a messenger between Atterbury and the Stuart court. He was integrally involved in the Atterbury Plot, alongside his associate Christopher Layer, and was arrested by British authorities when the plot collapsed in spring 1722. Kelly spent the following fourteen years imprisoned in the Tower of London, during which time he published translations of Castlenau's Memoirs of the English Affairs (1724) and Morabin's History of Cicero's Banishment (1725).

On 26 October 1736 Kelly escaped from the Tower with the aid of Jacobite sympathisers, including Fr Myles McDonnell, and made his way to Avignon. In 1736 a memoir of his experiences was published by Edmund Curll. In Avignon he befriended James Butler, 2nd Duke of Ormonde, who he served as chaplain and secretary. By 1743, he had become an associate of Prince Charles who made Kelly his representative at the French court at Versailles. At Versailles, Kelly clashed with and undermined the Jacobite agents Francis Sempill and Daniel O'Brien, who had been appointed by Charles' father, James. As a result, James came to distrust Kelly, but Charles retained him in his service and gave him management of the Jacobite's propaganda efforts.

Kelly was in the company of Prince Charles when he set sail for Scotland on 5 July 1745. The Prince's group reached Eriskay on 23 July 1745 before landing on the mainland at Loch nan Uamh and initiating the rising on 19 August. Following the Jacobite victory at the Battle of Prestonpans in September, the Prince sent Kelly back to France with news of the rising's success in the hope of gaining further support. Kelly is credited with helping to secure the Treaty of Fontainebleau, even though it was signed by his rival, O'Brien, on behalf of Prince Charles. On 10 October, Prince Charles issued the Jacobite manifesto, which had been drawn up by Kelly, from Holyrood Palace.

Following the defeat of the Jacobites at the Battle of Culloden in April 1746 and Prince Charles's escape from Scotland with Richard Warren, Kelly remained in Charles's service as his secretary. This was despite James continuing to view Kelly as a malign influence on the Prince, suspecting that he was a British government agent. Kelly was relieved of his position as secretary in 1749, but was still a companion of Prince Charles in the 1750s. He entered into relative obscurity, returning briefly in 1760 to sow dissension between the increasingly dissolute Charles and his lover Clementina Walkinshaw. The date of his death is unknown.

The historian and biographer of Charles Stuart, Frank McLynn, described Kelly as "one of the few truly evil men among the Jacobites". William MacGregor of Balhaldy wrote of Kelly to James Edgar on 31 May 1747, "trick, falsehood, deceit, and imposition, [are] joined to those qualities that make up a sycophant". He was played by Harry Schofield in the 1948 film Bonnie Prince Charlie.
