= John Hay of Restalrig =

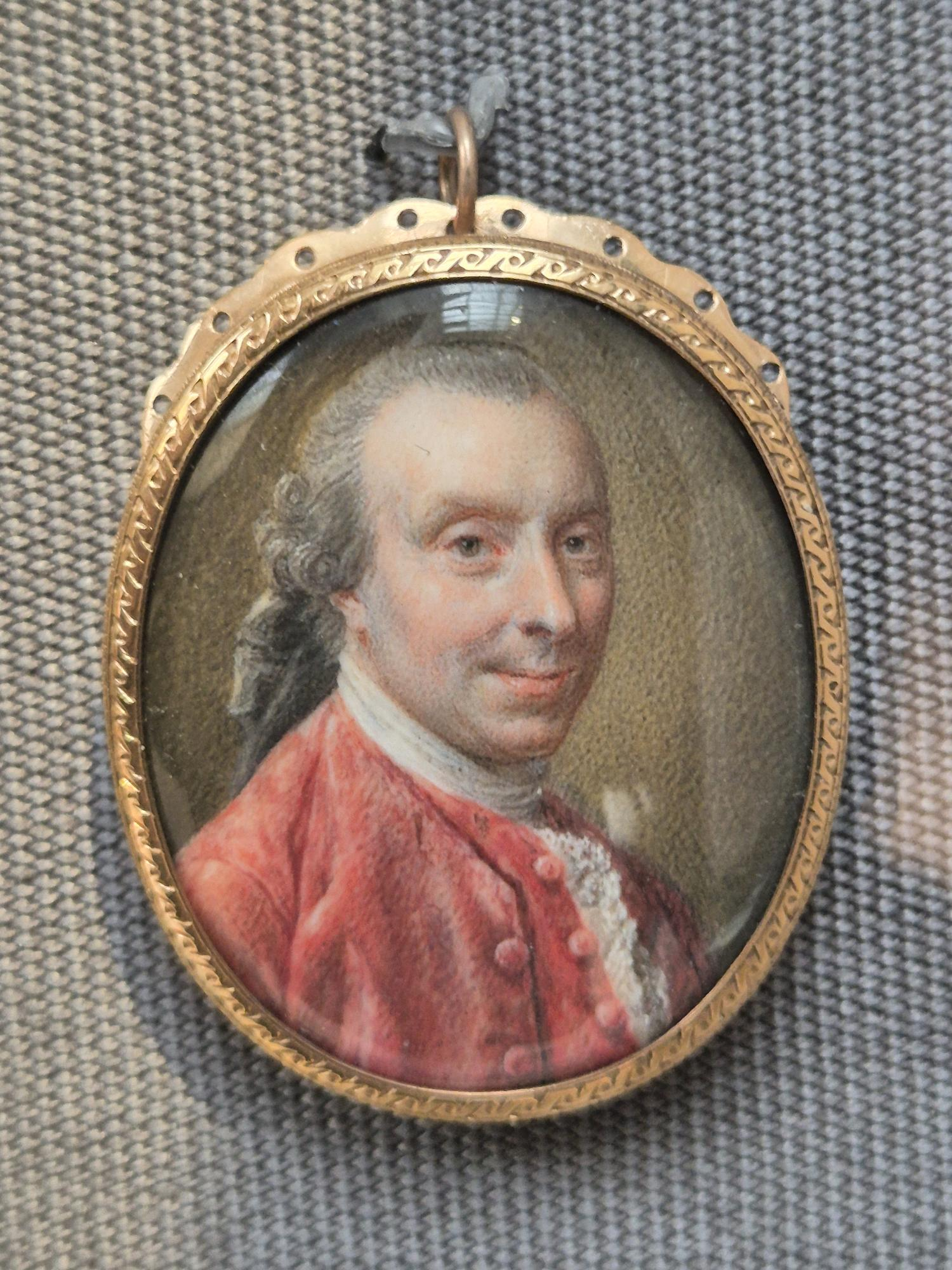
Watercolour portrait of Sir John Hay of Restalrig in the Scottish National Portrait Gallery, painted about 1771 by Samuel Cotes

John Hay of Restalrig (c.1705 – 1781) was a Scottish Jacobite who was Secretary to Charles Edward Stuart during the final stage of the Jacobite rising of 1745.

== Biography ==
Hay was the son of Alexander Hay and Mary Gordon. He trained in law, was admitted as a Writer to His Majesty's Signet in March 1726 and was a substitute Keeper of the Signet from 1742 to 1744. Following the landing of Prince Charles in Scotland in 1745, Hay joined the Jacobite forces and was appointed Treasurer to the prince, being responsible for the payment of draughts for the purchase of weapons. In March 1746 he was appointed Secretary in succession to John Murray of Broughton. His competence was criticised by Lord George Murray, who blamed him for logistical failures while Quartermaster before the Battle of Culloden.

Following the defeat of the Jacobites, Hay was attainted by the British government in June 1746. This include the forfeiture and sale of his lands and farms in parts of Restalrig near Edinburgh.

He followed Prince Charles into exile and continued to serve in his personal retinue. Hay accompanied Charles to Rome following the death of James Francis Edward Stuart in January 1766 and was appointed Master (Major-Domo) of the Household in place of Sir John Constable. On 31 December 1766, he was created a baronet in the Jacobite peerage. He remained with Charles until 8 December 1768, when he was dismissed. Hay returned to Scotland, where he died in 1781.

Through his marriage to Anne, the only child of James Elphinstone, he became the owner of Restalrig House in Edinburgh. He was succeeded in his Jacobite title by his son, Alexander. The Jacobite title merged with the Hay baronetcy of Alderston in 1825.
