= Agostino Tinazzoli =

Italian composer

Agostino Tinazzoli (Bologna, ca. 1660 – Sant'Angelo in Vado, 10 February 1725) was an Italian baroque composer and organist.

== Life ==
Little is known about Tinazzoli's life. He was an organist in Ferrara around 1690; he then moved to Roma, where he was imprisoned in Castel Sant'Angelo for an unspecified offence. In jail, he may have written the "In carcere penoso privo" cantata.

After being released, he went back to his birthplace, Emilia-Romagna, and then moved to Recanati, Marche, where he was appointed Maestro di cappella and opera director in 1720. His compositions include cantatas, Drammi per musica, Keyboard works.

In October 1718, Tinazzoli played at James Francis Edward Stuart's court-in-exile in Urbino. David Nairne, Stuart's Secretary of the Closet for private letters and dispatches, described Tinazzoli as "one of the best players on the harpsichord and ablest masters of music in Italy".

== Recordings ==
- Complete Keyboard Works, Simone Pierini Harpsichord & Organ, Brilliant Classics 96875, 2023

== General references ==
- CD notes to Complete Keyboard Works, Simone Pierini Harpsichord & Organ, Brilliant Classics 96875, 2023
