= Francis Cottington =

Francis Cottington may refer to:

- Francis Cottington, 1st Baron Cottington (c.1579–1652), English statesman under Charles I
- Francis Cottington (Jacobite) (c.1685–1728), English Jacobite landowner
