= José de Rozas =

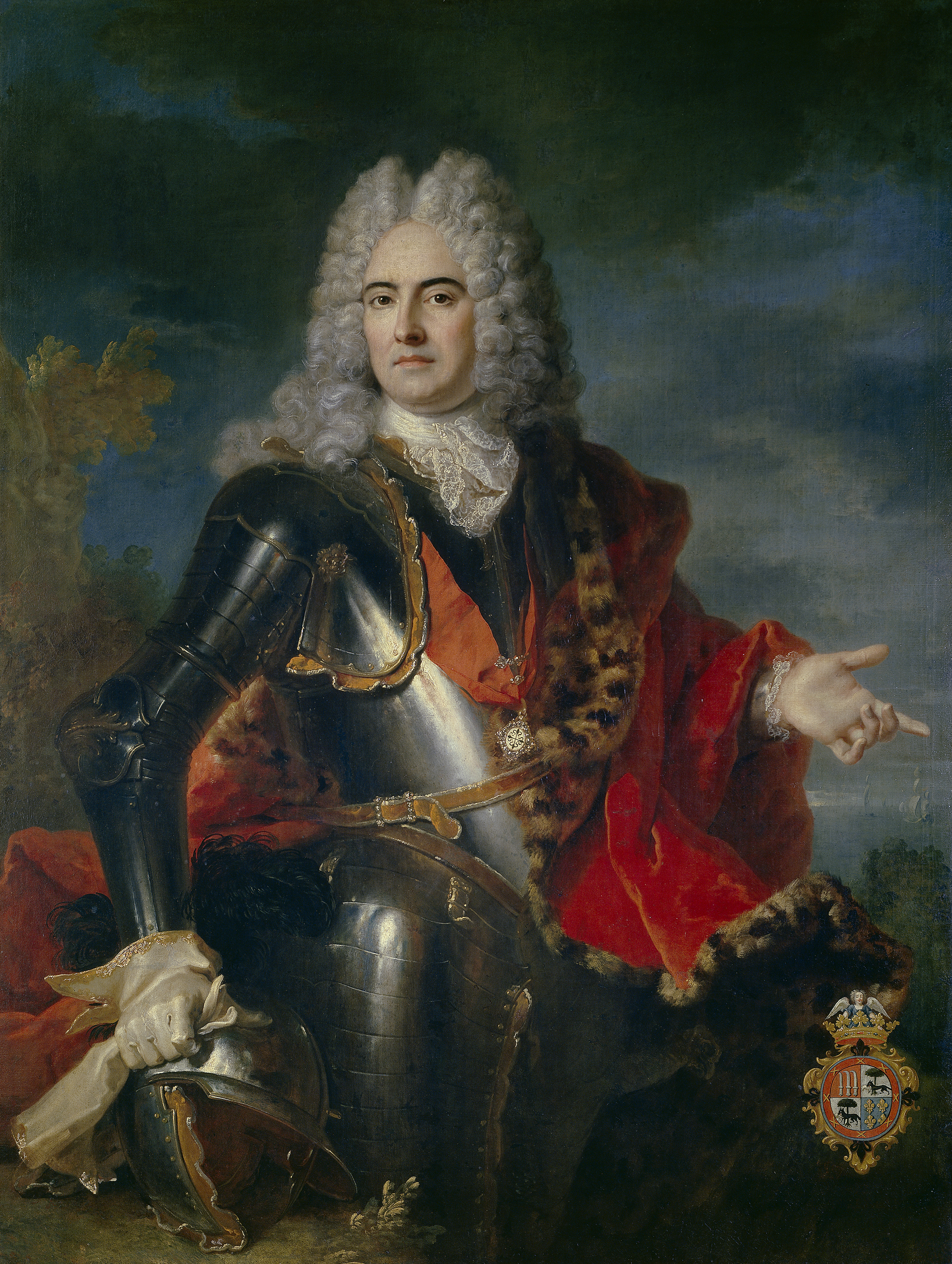
José de Rozas y Meléndez de la Cueva, 1st Count of Castelblanco (c.1716), by Jean-Baptiste Oudry, Prado Museum, Madrid.

José de Rozas y Meléndez de la Cueva, 1st Count of Castelblanco (16 December 1665 – July 1722) was a Spanish nobleman and colonial official who became a leading figure in Jacobite politics in Europe.

== Biography ==
José de Rozas was the son of Francisco de Rozas y Fernández de Santayana, a knight of the Order of Alcántara. He was born in Lima in the Viceroyalty of Peru. José de Rozas became one of the key rivals of the viceroy of Peru, Manuel de Oms. In 1700 he was appointed to the Captaincy General of Guatemala and as President of the Real Audiencia of Guatemala.

He became involved in Jacobite politics through the exiled court of James Francis Edward Stuart in France and Italy, which had close links with the Spanish court through agents like Toby Bourke. On 4 February 1717 he was created Duke of St Andrews and Castelblanco, Marquess of Borland, Earl of Fordan, Viscount of The Bass and Lord Divron in the Jacobite peerage of Scotland. José de Rozas was responsible for sourcing the money to fund the Jacobite rising of 1719.

=== Marriage and children ===
José de Rozas was married three times. His first marriage to Magdalena de Irrutia ended with her death. His second and third marriages were to Mary and Francesca, both daughters of John Drummond, 1st Earl of Melfort. By Francesca he had three children :

- Josefa de Rozas y Drummond de Melfort, the mother of María Teresa de Vallabriga who married Infante Luis of Spain
- María Benita de Rozas y Drummond de Melfort, married Pedro Fitz-James Stuart, Capitain General of the Navy.
- Juan José de Rozas y Drummond de Melfort, 3rd Count of Castelblanco.
