= Anne Oglethorpe =

Anne Henrietta Oglethorpe (1683–1756), whose name at baptism was entered in the register as An Harath Oglethorp, was an English Jacobite agent who worked to restore James II to the throne after he was deposed by the Glorious Revolution. Following the death of James II in 1701, she continued her efforts on behalf of James Francis Edward Stuart, the Old Pretender, for the remainder of her life.

== Family history ==
Anne Oglethorpe's mother, Eleanor Oglethorpe, was an employee of the royal household during the reigns of Charles II and James II; she followed James II to France, where he was exiled after the Glorious Revolution. Anne's father, Theophilus Oglethorpe, also offered his service to James, but as a Protestant he was eventually sidelined. Eleanor and Theophilus returned to Westbrook, their estate outside London, where they remained secretly and actively in the service of the Jacobite cause. Anne was the only daughter to remain with her parents in England; her three sisters lived in France after the revolution and married into French nobility. Anne assisted her mother in raising James Edward Oglethorpe at Westbrook. He later became a reformer in Parliament, the founder of the Georgia Colony, and a prominent figure among London intellectuals in the Age of Johnson. Anne moved to Europe when James was grown. She was made Countess of Oglethorpe in the Jacobite peerage by James III.

== Jacobite activities ==
Anne Oglethorpe became involved with Robert Harley, minister to Queen Anne, when he met with her after she was detained for questioning about a trip to France. She used the relationship with Harley to promote communication with James III about succeeding Queen Anne to the throne.

At Westbrook, Anne was involved with her mother in coordinating Jacobite plots to overthrow George I, who succeeded Queen Anne. Evidence suggests that they ran a smuggling operation from their estate to raise funds for the cause. A secret tunnel from the town of Godalming to the house at Westbrook allowed for clandestine meetings. James III's son Charles Edward Stuart (the Young Pretender), may have stayed there during a clandestine trip to England.

As a result of their Jacobite intrigues, myths developed around the Oglethorpes. In one instance, Anne or her younger sister Fanny were variously called Queen Oglethorpe or Her Oglethorpean Majesty, in the belief that she was mistress to James III.

== Bibliography ==
- Ettinger, Amos Aschbach, James Edward Oglethorpe: Imperial Idealist. Archon Books, 1968. Reprinted with permission of Oxford University Press.
- Hill, Patricia Kneas, The Oglethorpe Ladies. Atlanta: Cherokee Publishing Company, 1977.
- Lang, Andrew, “Queen Oglethorpe” (with Alice Shield). Historical Mysteries. London: Smith, Elder, & Co., 1904.
- Monod, Paul Kleber, Jacobitism and the English People, 1688-1788, Cambridge: Cambridge University Press, 1989.
- Monod, Paul Kleber, “Dangerous Merchandise: Smuggling, Jacobitism, and Commercial Culture in Southeast England, 1690-1760.” The Journal of British Studies. 30 (2): 150-182.

Peerage of Ireland
New creation	— TITULAR — Countess Oglethorpe of Oglethorpe; Jacobite peerage 1722–1756	Extinct
