= Andrew Lumisden =

Scottish Jacobite

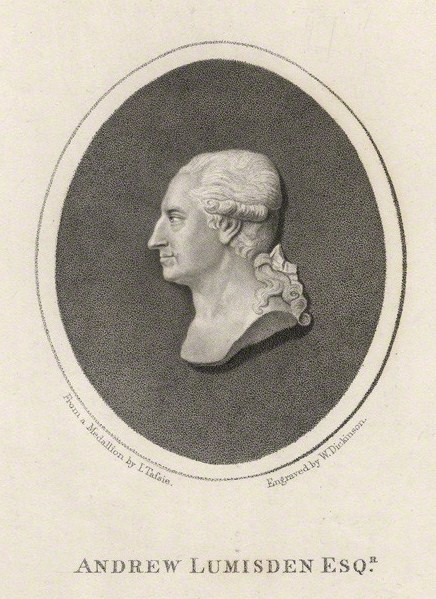
Andrew Lumisden, 1784 engraving by William Dickinson after James Tassie

Andrew Lumisden, Lumsden or Lumiden FRSE FSA (1720–25 December 1801) was a Scottish Jacobite. He was Personal Secretary to Bonnie Prince Charlie during his exile in Rome. He was a joint founder of the Royal Society of Edinburgh in 1783.

== Early life ==
He was the only son of William Lumisden, a law agent in Edinburgh, and his wife, Mary Bruce, daughter of Robert Bruce, an Edinburgh merchant. He was educated at the High School in Edinburgh then studied law at the University of Edinburgh, which he followed until the Jacobite Rebellion of 1745.

== The '45 ==
On the recommendation of Dr Alexander Cunningham, a younger son of Sir William Cunningham of Caprington, Ayrshire, Lumisden became private secretary to Charles Edward Stuart shortly after his arrival in Edinburgh. He accompanied the prince throughout the campaign, and was present at the battle of Culloden. On the eve of the battle the prince's aide-de-camp wrote to Ewen MacPherson of Cluny, asking him to take particular care of Lumisden and Thomas Sheridan, "as they carry the sinews of war".

After the battle Lumisden obeyed the order to rendezvous at Fort Ruthven, where a message from Charles Edward on 17 April warned all to look after their own safety. He was included in the Act of Attainder, and, after staying in Highland fastnesses for four months, went to Edinburgh disguised in a black wig, as the liveried groom of a lady who rode pillion behind him on a horse. After lurking in concealment in his father's house till October, he accompanied to London, as a poor teacher, the king's messenger, who had been in Scotland citing witnesses for the treason trials.

== Exile ==
At the end of 1745 Lumisden embarked at the Towers Stairs for Rouen. Here he lived in poverty, until in May 1749 he obtained the first grant of an allowance made by the French court to the Spanish exiles. He then went via Paris to Rome, where early in 1757 he was appointed salaried under-secretary to the Chevalier de St. George. In September 1762, after the death of James Edgar, he became sole secretary, and he held the post till the death of the chevalier in January 1766.

In Rome, Lumisden established himself as an antiquary, archaeologist and cicerone. His position at the Jacobite court and acquaintance with established masters such as Anton Raphael Mengs made him a valuable contact for young Scottish artists. Painting students who benefited from a letter of introduction to him included George Chalmers, Cosmo Alexander, Catherine Read, Anne Forbes, David Allan, James Nevay and George Willison.

In 1758–9 Lumisden undertook a secret mission to France, but otherwise his duties consisted in answering requests for honours, or appeals for help from supporters of the Stuart cause. He was continued in office by Charles Edward, who made use of him very much as a factotum. Ultimately, in December 1768, he was dismissed by Charles for refusing to allow him to attend an oratorio while drunk. Not long afterwards he declined an invitation to return.

== Paris ==
In the spring of 1769 Lumisden set out for Paris, and now having an income from his father's estate, he became a writer. Around 12 June 1770, he met Charles Burney (composer and musicographist), recommended to him as a potential shrewd tip and information provider for his musical state of art trip throughout Europe between 1770 and 1772. A petition having been presented in his favour on 15 February 1773, he was allowed to return home, and five years later a free pardon was granted him. He visited Scotland, but continued for a period to make Paris his base.

== Later life and works ==
In 1783 Lumisden was back in Edinburgh and was a joint founder of the Royal Society of Edinburgh. In 1797 the fruits of his antiquarian and archaeological research were published as Remarks on the Antiquities of Rome and its Environs, reprinted in 1812. He also compiled a pedigree of his family, which was published in James Maidment's Analecta Scotica, vol. ii.

He appears to have lived at Thistle Court in the New Town.

Lumisden died in Edinburgh on 25 December 1801.

== Family ==
Lumisden's sister, Isabella, was the wife of Sir Robert Strange.

== Notes ==
Attribution

This article incorporates text from a publication now in the public domain: Lee, Sidney, ed. (1893). "Lumisden, Andrew". Dictionary of National Biography. Vol. 34. London: Smith, Elder & Co.

Political offices
Preceded by James Edgar	Jacobite Secretary of State; 1764–1768	Succeeded by John Baptist Caryll
