= Alexander MacGregor Drummond =

Alexander MacGregor Drummond, 4th of Balhaldie (1660 – 1 March 1749) was a Scottish Jacobite chieftain and soldier.

== Biography ==
Drummond (originally MacGregor) was born at Balhaldie, Perthshire, the son of Duncan MacGregor and Helen Linton, and was a cousin of Rob Roy MacGregor. In 1683 he inherited his father's lands and title as 4th Laird of Balhaldie, a junior branch of Clan Gregor. He participated in the Jacobite rising of 1689 and fought at the Battle of Killiecrankie.

In July 1714, a group of Clan Gregor notables elected Drummond in secret as clan chief. His position as chief was, however, challenged by John Murray, 1st Duke of Atholl and other elements of the clan, and his claim was not widely recognised. He joined the Jacobite rising of 1715 and fought at the Battle of Sheriffmuir, which took place only three miles from his estate. As the battle ended, Drummond was pursued to his house by Government dragoons but evaded capture. With the rest of his clan, he was excluded from the Indemnity Act 1717. On 14 March 1740, the exiled James Francis Edward Stuart created Drummond a baronet in the Jacobite peerage.

Drummond was an active Jacobite agent in the years preceding the Jacobite rising of 1745, communicating regularly with the exiled Jacobite court about the readiness of Jacobites in Scotland and England for the rebellion. He did not participate directly in the rising, but allowed Charles Edward Stuart to stay at his residence at Balhaldie House, Dunblane on 11 September 1745.

He married Margaret Cameron, daughter of Ewan Cameron of Lochiel, on 26 April 1686 in Edinburgh. They had ten children. His eldest son, William, was a Jacobite agent who was exempted from the Indemnity Act 1747 and died in exile in France.
