= Owen O'Rourke =

Irish Jacobite soldier and peer

Owen O'Rourke (c.1670 – 1743), also referred to as Audeonus or Eugenius O'Rourke and as Viscount Breffney in Jacobite circles, was an Irish Jacobite soldier and agent in Europe.

== Biography ==
O'Rourke was born at Castle Car, County Leitrim, and was a descendant of Sir Brian O'Rourke. By 1690 he had joined the Jacobite army of James II in Ireland and he participated in the Battle of the Boyne that year and the Battle of Aughrim in 1691. Following the defeat of the Jacobites, O'Rourke followed James II into exile in France in the Flight of the Wild Geese. There he joined the Regiment de Limerick of the Irish Brigade.

In 1679, O'Rouke offered his services to Leopold, Duke of Lorraine, who made him counsellor of state and subsequently elevated him to the nobility of Lorraine as a count. In 1727, James Francis Edward Stuart appointed O'Rouke as his ambassador to the imperial court in Vienna and made him Baron O'Rourke in the Jacobite peerage. On 31 July 1731 he was further made Viscount Breffney in reference to his ancestors' rule over the Kingdom of Breifne. O'Rourke had no children, so he was created Viscount Breffney again in July 1742 but with a special remainder to his cousin Constantine O'Rourke, a count of the Russian Empire. O'Rouke held the Jacobite diplomatic post in Vienna until his death in 1743.

O'Rourke married Catharine Diana de Beauveau, sister to the Prince of Craon, but left no issue.

Peerage of Ireland
New creation	— TITULAR — Viscount Breffney; Jacobite peerage 1731–1743	Extinct
New creation	— TITULAR — Baron O'Rourke; Jacobite peerage 1727–1743	Extinct
