= Eleanor Oglethorpe =

- Born: Eleanor Wall; 1662; County Tipperary
- Died: 1732 (aged 69–70)
- Spouse: Theophilus Oglethorpe

Eleanor Oglethorpe (1662–1732) was a courtier in the royal household during the reigns of Charles II and James II. She followed James II to France, where he was exiled after the Glorious Revolution. Eleanor and her husband Theophilus Oglethorpe returned to their estate outside London, but remained secretly and actively in the service of the House of Stuart. After Theophilus and William III died in 1702 she became an advisor to Queen Anne, even as she continued working for the Jacobite cause. Eleanor Oglethorpe was the mother of James Edward Oglethorpe, the philanthropist, social reformer, politician, and soldier who founded Georgia.

== Early life ==
Eleanor Wall, or Du-Vall, was born in County Tipperary, Ireland, where she was raised Catholic. She traced her family ancestry to Richard Seigneur de Val Dery, an associate of William the Conqueror; and she claimed kinship to nobility, including the House of Argyll, a prominent Scottish clan loyal to the House of Stuart. Her father, Richard Wall, loyally defended Charles I against Oliver Cromwell, beginning a family affiliation with the House of Stuart.

== Employment with the House of Stuart ==
Eleanor Wall was employed in the household of Charles II at a young age. In 1681, while holding the position of head laundress she met and soon married a young army officer, Theophilus Oglethorpe, who was quartered on the Thames River next to the royal palace. Through both loyalty and ability the couple rose in stature during the reign of Charles II, and both were present at his death in 1685.

Charles II was succeeded by his brother, James II, who rewarded the Oglethorpes’ continued loyalty by making Eleanor Lady Oglethorpe and knighting Theophilus. James II was Catholic as well as a believer in the theory of divine right of kings advanced by his grandfather, James I. In order to restore a Protestant monarchy and balanced government, Parliament engineered a coup d’état, soon known as the Glorious Revolution, that brought William III and Mary II to power.

== Agent of the Jacobite Cause ==
James II went into exile in France, where he was supported by Louis XIV. Eleanor and Theophilus Oglethorpe remained loyal to James II and followed him to Paris. They soon returned to their estate, Westbrook Manor, in Surrey. From there they continued to secretly serve James II and plotted his return to the throne. After the deaths of James II and Theophilus in 1702, Eleanor remained loyal to the Catholic Stuart line by supporting and advising James Francis Edward Stuart, heir of James II, who was recognized by France as James III and was known in England as The Old Pretender.

Eleanor Oglethorpe continued her efforts on behalf of James III until her death in 1732. Westbrook Manor became a meeting place for Jacobites planning the restoration of the Catholic House of Stuart, and who were engaged in smuggling to finance the cause. The manor house had a trap door leading to a tunnel to the town of Godalming that was used by the conspirators.

== Children ==
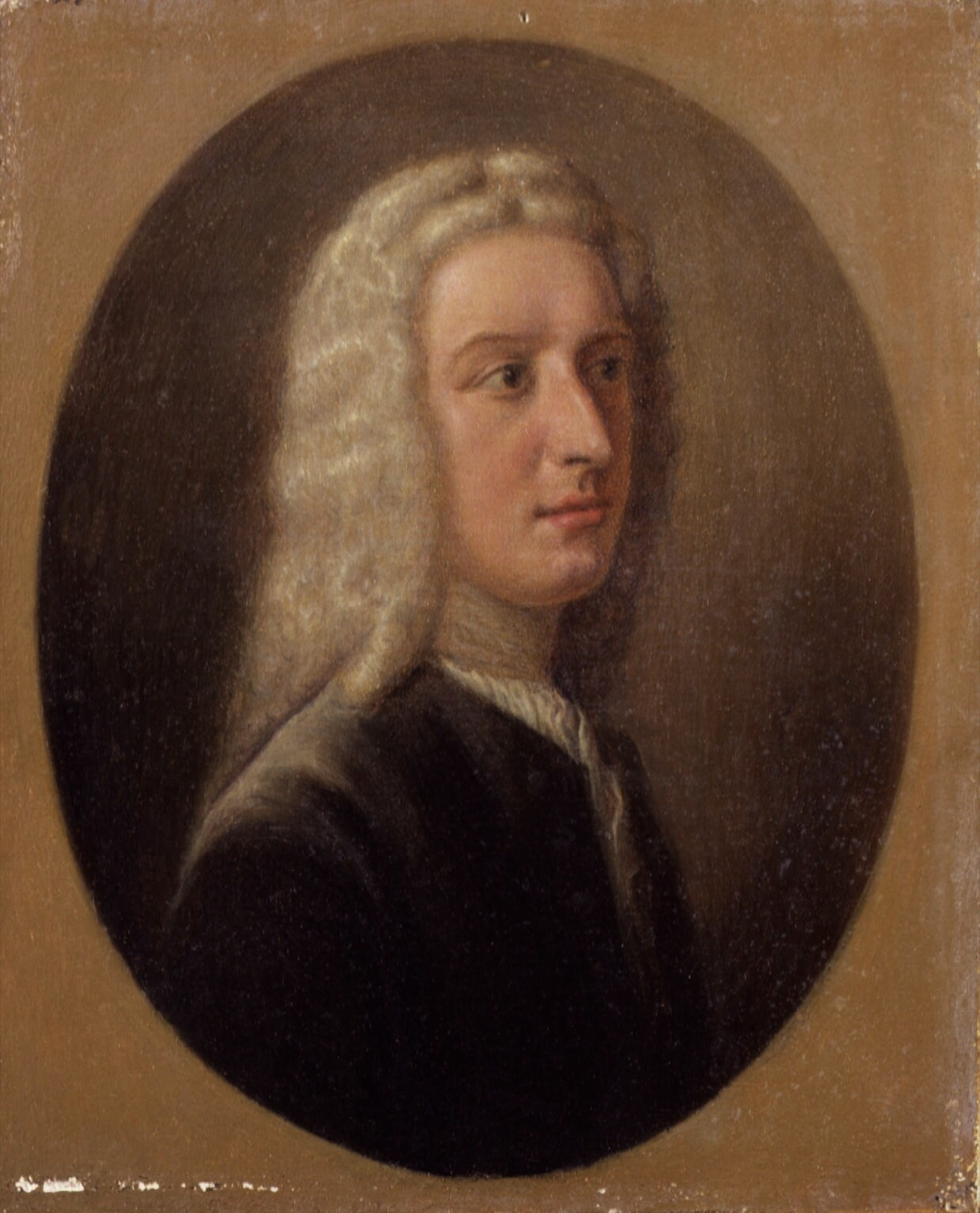
James Edward Oglethorpe

Eleanor Oglethorpe's children were drawn into the Jacobite cause and actively supported James III. Sons Lewis and Theophilus Junior remained with her in London for a time and served in Parliament after their father's death. Eventually Lewis went to Europe, where he died in combat. Theophilus Junior later worked for the East India Company then returned to Europe seeking a position with James III; he failed to secure a position but was made Baron Oglethorpe, probably as an honor to Eleanor. Daughters Anne Henrietta, baptized An Harath (1683–1756), Eleanor (1684–1775), Luisa Mary (1693-?), and Frances Charlotte (1695-?) all became active Jacobites. Anne remained at Westbrook to assist her parents, and later moved to Europe; she was made Countess of Oglethorpe by James III. Daughter Eleanor married Marquis de Mezieres, with whom she had seven children; they lived in France from 1689; descendants include members of royal families throughout Europe. Luisa (Molly) married the Marquis de Bersompierre and lived in France and then in Spain, where she held a post in the royal court. Frances (Fanny) married the Marquis des Marches of Piedmont, with whom she had at least one son; she lived in France until she became lady-in-waiting to the Queen of Savoy and Sicily about 1726.

Oglethorpe intrigues led to rumors about Eleanor's children that developed into myths. In one instance, James III was rumored to be James Oglethorpe (not James Edward who was born in 1696), switched at birth when the actual Stuart heir died in 1689. In another, Anne or Fanny Oglethorpe were variously depicted as Queen Oglethorpe or Her Oglethorpean Majesty, and mistress to James III.

Eleanor Oglethorpe's youngest and most famous child, James Edward Oglethorpe (1696–1785), managed to distance himself sufficiently from the Jacobite cause to become an effective Member of Parliament and notable presence in eighteenth century London society.

== Bibliography ==
Ettinger, Amos Aschbach. James Edward Oglethorpe: Imperial Idealist. Archon Books, 1968. Reprinted with permission of Oxford University Press.

Hill, Patricia Kneas. The Oglethorpe Ladies. Atlanta: Cherokee Publishing Company, 1977.

Lang, Andrew. "Queen Oglethorpe" (with Alice Shield). Historical Mysteries. London: Smith, Elder, & Co., 1904.

Monod, Paul Kleber. Jacobitism and the English People, 1688-1788. Cambridge: Cambridge University Press, 1989.

Monod, Paul Kleber. "Dangerous Merchandise: Smuggling, Jacobitism, and Commercial Culture in Southeast England, 1690-1760." The Journal of British Studies. 30 (2): 150–182.
