= Duke of Mar =

Jacobite title

The Jacobite title of Duke of Mar was conferred on John Erskine, 6th/23rd Earl of Mar, by the Jacobite pretender James III and VIII. He was created Duke of Mar, Marquess Erskine or Marquess of Stirling, Earl of Kildrummie, Viscount of Garioch and Lord Alloa, Ferriton and Forrest in the notional Peerage of Scotland in 1715, with the same remainder as his Earldom, i.e. to heirs-general. The Duke's attainder by the government of the Hanoverian George I the following year was, of course, not recognised in Jacobite circles. He was further created Earl of Mar in the Peerage of England in 1717 and Duke of Mar in the Peerage of Ireland in 1722. These titles had the ordinary remainder to heirs male of the body, and became extinct on the death of the grantee's son in 1766. The other titles, such as they are, remain extant, although they are not recognised by the British or any other government and have not been claimed or used by their holders since the eighteenth century.

== Dukes of Mar (1722) and Earls of Mar (1717) ==
- John Erskine, 6th/23rd and 1st Earl of Mar, 1st Duke of Mar (1675–1732)
- Thomas Erskine, 7th/24th and 2nd Earl of Mar, 2nd Duke of Mar (1705–1766)

== Dukes of Mar (1715) ==
(numbering of Earls ignores the attainder of 1716, and is therefore different from that currently used)

- John Erskine, 6th/23rd Earl of Mar, 1st Duke of Mar (1675–1732)
- Thomas Erskine, 7th/24th Earl of Mar, 2nd Duke of Mar (1705–1766)
- Frances Erskine, 8th/25th Countess of Mar, 3rd Duchess of Mar (died 1776)
- John Francis Erskine, 9th/26th Earl of Mar, 4th Duke of Mar (1741–1825)
- John Thomas Erskine, 10th/27th Earl of Mar, 5th Duke of Mar (1772–1828)
- John Francis Miller Erskine, 11th/28th Earl of Mar, 6th Duke of Mar (1795–1866)
- John Francis Goodeve Erskine, 29th Earl of Mar, 7th Duke of Mar (1836–1930)
- John Erskine, 30th Earl of Mar, 8th Duke of Mar (1868–1932)
- Lionel Walter Young, 31st Earl of Mar, 9th Duke of Mar (1891–1965)
- James Clifton Lane of Mar, 32nd Earl of Mar, 10th Duke of Mar (1914–1975)
- Margaret of Mar, 33rd Countess of Mar, 11th Duchess of Mar (born 1940)
