= Eleanor Oglethorpe de Mezieres =

Eleanor Oglethorpe (1684–1775), later Marquise de Mézières, was an English Jacobite who settled in France after James II was deposed in the Glorious Revolution of 1688. She served as an agent and advisor to James III "The Old Pretender" after the death of his father in 1701. Eleanor married, in 1707, Eugène Marie de Béthisy, Marquis de Mézières, with whom she had seven children; their descendants include members of royal families throughout Europe.

== Family ==
Eleanor Oglethorpe's mother, also Eleanor Oglethorpe (née Wall), was an employee of the royal household during the reigns of Charles II and James II; she followed the latter to France, where he was exiled after the Glorious Revolution. Eleanor's father, Theophilus Oglethorpe, also offered his service to James, but as a Protestant he was eventually sidelined. Theophilus and the elder Eleanor returned to Westbrook, their estate outside London, where they remained secretly and actively in the service of the Jacobite cause.

Eleanor's brother was James Edward Oglethorpe, who was raised at the family's Westbrook estate. He later became a reformer in Parliament, the founder of the Georgia Colony, an officer in the army of Frederick the Great, and a prominent figure among London intellectuals in the Age of Johnson. James spent considerable time in Paris with sister Eleanor after his service with Frederick.

== Jacobite activities ==
Eleanor and her sisters Molly and Fanny, all of whom married into French nobility, were strong supporters of the Jacobite cause. Eleanor's Paris townhouse was a hub of Jacobite activity and a shelter for co-conspirators. When Henry St John, Lord Bolingbroke joined the cause, Eleanor and her husband associated with him in Paris. When Bolingbroke betrayed the cause, it was Eleanor who discovered his secret communication with authorities in London hidden in a house she owned used as the British ambassador's residence.

At Westbrook, Eleanor's mother and her older sister Anne were involved in coordinating Jacobite plots to overthrow George I, who succeeded Queen Anne. Evidence suggests that they ran a smuggling operation from their estate to raise funds for the cause. A secret tunnel from the town of Godalming to the house at Westbrook allowed for clandestine meetings. James III's son, the Young Pretender, may have stayed there during a clandestine trip to England.

As a result of their Jacobite intrigues, myths developed around the Oglethorpes. In one instance, James III was rumored to be born an Oglethorpe boy, switched at birth when the actual Stuart heir died in 1689. In another, Eleanor's sisters Anne and Fanny were variously called Queen Oglethorpe or Her Oglethorpean Majesty, in the belief one or the other was mistress to James III.

== French Mississippi Company ==
Eleanor Oglethorpe was an early backer of the French Mississippi Company, and recruited colonists to settle the lower Mississippi region. The enterprise was expected to accelerate settlement and trade in France's Louisiana colony. Stock in the company was oversold, creating an investment bubble that burst in 1720. Eleanor and her husband sold her stock before the collapse, greatly increasing their wealth.

== Bibliography ==
- Ettinger, Amos Aschbach. James Edward Oglethorpe: Imperial Idealist. Archon Books, 1968. Reprinted with permission of Oxford University Press.
- Hill, Patricia Kneas. The Oglethorpe Ladies. Atlanta: Cherokee Publishing Company, 1977.
- Lang, Andrew. "Queen Oglethorpe" (with Alice Shield). Historical Mysteries. London: Smith, Elder, & Co., 1904.
- Monod, Paul Kleber. Jacobitism and the English People, 1688-1788. Cambridge: Cambridge University Press, 1989.
