= Thomas Sheridan (politician) =

Anglo-Irish lawyer, political author and Jacobite

Sir Thomas Sheridan, the elder (c. 1646 – 17 March 1712) was an Anglo-Irish lawyer, political author and Jacobite, who served as the Chief Secretary for Ireland between 1687 and 1688.

== Early life ==
Sheridan was born in St. John's, County Meath, Ireland, the fourth son of Reverend Dennis Sheridan, the Church of Ireland rector of Killesher parish, County Fermanagh. His siblings included William Sheridan, Patrick Sheridan the Anglican bishop of Cloyne and Margery Sheridan, wife of Colonel Meredith Gwyllym of Ballyconnell. He was brought up as a Protestant within the established church.

Sheridan entered Trinity College, Dublin on 17 January 1661 from where he was awarded a Bachelor of Arts degree in 1664, and in 1667 he was elected a Fellow of Trinity.

== Career ==
Sheridan attended the Middle Temple in London from 29 June 1670 to study law, but cut his studies short when he was appointed Cork Collector of Customs, where he made his fortune. In 1676 he was appointed a farmer of the Irish Revenue and sold his interest for a profit of £4,000. Sheridan began to acquire powerful patrons, including James, Duke of York and the Duke of Ormond, and by early 1677 he had left Ireland for England. On 6 August 1677 Sheridan received an honorary degree of Doctor of Civil Law from the University of Oxford and on 6 February 1679 he was elected a Fellow of the Royal Society in London. In 1678 he published, anonymously, A discourse of the rise & power of parliaments, in which he advocated religious toleration, including for Roman Catholics. By the summer of that year, with suspicion around the Popish Plot mounting, Sheridan issued a second edition of his book with a preface that denied that he had any sympathy for subversive political movements.

By this stage, Sheridan was firmly within the Duke of York's entourage and in 1679 he followed the duke into exile in Brussels. Soon after his return to England in 1680, Sheridan was imprisoned on suspicion of complicity in the Popish Plot. On 15 December 1680 he gave evidence before the House of Commons but, as Parliament was dissolved shortly afterwards, he was set free in early 1681. His speech before the Commons was later published. Despite this affair, Sheridan retained royal favour and was commissioned by Charles II to produce proposals for farming the Irish revenue. In 1682, Charles awarded Sheridan a lump sum of £1,000 and an annual pension of £500.

=== Chief Secretary for Ireland ===
Soon after the accession of the Catholic king, James II, in 1686 Sheridan announced his own conversation to Roman Catholicism. Later that year, against his wishes, Sheridan was appointed secretary to Richard Talbot, 1st Earl of Tyrconnell, the Lord Deputy of Ireland. He was also made first commissioner of the Irish revenue. Sheridan clashed with Tyrconnell, whom he characterised as bigoted; Sheridcan also believed Tyrconnell was trying to break Ireland's link with Britain. In 1687, James appointed Sheridan as Chief Secretary for Ireland, but Tyrconnell used his influence to have Sheridan found guilty of corruption and removed from all his offices in January 1688.

=== Later career and death ===
After the Glorious Revolution, in January 1689 Sheridan followed James II into exile in France. Here he authored several works of Jacobite propaganda, including a formal defence of James' reign; the draft of The king of Great Britain's case was produced in 1692 but remained unpublished. He penned a defence of the Catholic clergy after their banishment from Ireland in 1697, and in 1709 he wrote a manuscript entitled Political reflexions on the history and government of England, a uncompromising defence of royal absolutism. His collective works, The Sheridan Papers are contained in the Stuart papers of the Royal Archives. He also translated A Survey of Princes by Jean-Louis Guez de Balzac.

Sheridan died at the exiled Stuart court at Château de Saint-Germain-en-Laye near Paris on 17 March 1712.

== Family ==
At some point around, 1684 Sheridan married Helen Ravenscroft (née Appleby), widow of George Ravenscroft, the developer of English lead crystal, and the daughter of Thomas Appleby and Helen Gascoigne of Linton-on-Ouse in Yorkshire. There were three children from the marriage, all of whom were raised as Roman Catholics: Therese Helen, Mary and Sir Thomas Sheridan junior who became tutor to Prince Charles Edward Stuart.

Political offices
Preceded by Patrick Tyrrell	Chief Secretary for Ireland; 1687–1688	Succeeded by Sir Paul Rycaut
