= John Graeme =

Jacobite agent

John Graeme (surname also spelled Graham) of Newton (1688 – January 1773), referred to as the Earl of Alford in Jacobite circles, was a Scottish Jacobite agent and minister who twice served as Secretary of State to the exiled James Francis Edward Stuart.

== Biography ==
Graeme was the eldest son and heir of James Graeme of Newton, Solicitor General for Scotland from 1687 to 1689, and Elizabeth (née Moray). He was raised as a Protestant. On 6 September 1726 he was knighted and made a baronet by the exiled James Stuart for his services at the Habsburg court in Vienna, where he had represented Jacobite interests. He was appointed Chief Secretary of State in succession to John Hay of Cromlix from May 1727 to August 1728, when he asked to be relieved of his duties. In 1744 he sold his estate at Newton.

Between 1745 and 1747, Graeme was in attendance on Henry Benedict Stuart in Paris. After Henry left France, Graeme was appointed to the household of Charles Edward Stuart, although he later left the prince and rejoined the Old Pretender's court at the Palazzo Muti. He converted to Roman Catholicism at Dijon in 1751. Between 1759 and 1763, Graeme served a second term as Secretary of State, succeeding Daniel O'Brien.

On 20 January 1760 he was made Earl of Alford, Viscount of Falkirk and Baron Newton in the Jacobite peerage. He retired to Paris as a result of age and infirmity, and died at the Scots College in 1773 without heirs.

Political offices
Preceded by Daniel O'Brien	Jacobite Secretary of State; 1759–1763	Succeeded by James Edgar
Preceded by John Hay of Cromlix	Jacobite Secretary of State; 1727–1728	Succeeded by James Murray, Earl of Dunbar
Peerage of Scotland
New creation	— TITULAR — Earl of Alford; Jacobite peerage 1760–1773	Extinct
