= Treaty of Fontainebleau (1745) =

Treaty between France and James Francis Edward Stuart

The Treaty of Fontainebleau was a 1745 treaty in which France committed itself to support the Jacobite rising of 1745.

It was signed on 24 October 1745 in Fontainebleau, France, between Louis XV of France and the pretender to the thrones of Great Britain and Ireland, James Francis Edward Stuart. It was signed for France by the Marquis d'Argenson and for James's son, Charles Edward Stuart, "Prince Regent of Scotland", by Colonel Daniel O'Brien.

The treaty came following the Jacobite victory at the Battle of Prestonpans, after which George Kelly had been sent by Prince Charles to France in the hope of garnering French support. Based on the terms of the accord, Louis recognized James as the rightful King of Scotland and promised to support him, militarily if necessary, in a claim on the throne of England, if it became apparent that the English people supported a Stuart restoration. Under the treaty, France offered "all practical assistance" to the Jacobite cause.

In the event, the rising collapsed. Although preparations were made at Dunkirk for a French force to invade England, it never set sail.
