= Patrick Lawless (Jacobite) =

Irish-born Jacobite and Spanish army officer and diplomat (1676–1739)

Patrick Lawless (1676 – 19 March 1739), known as Patricio Laules in Spain, was an Irish Jacobite soldier who became a diplomat in the service of Philip V of Spain.

== Biography ==
Lawless was the son of Walter Lawless of Kilkenny and Ann Bryan. By 1691, he was in the service of James II's Jacobite army in Ireland. He fought in the Williamite War in Ireland, being taken prisoner after the Battle of Aughrim. Released following the Treaty of Limerick, he joined the Flight of the Wild Geese to France where he was appointed a gentleman of the bedchamber to the exiled king and later to James Francis Edward Stuart, the Old Pretender.

After the Peace of Utrecht, Philip V appointed Lawless to be the Spanish ambassador to Anne, Queen of Great Britain. This caused concern among the Whig faction and was a complaint in the impeachment of Robert Harley, Earl of Oxford, with Harley accused of "receiving Patrick Lawless, an Irish Papist, as a foreign minister, and causing several sums of money to be paid to him". Lawless nonetheless retained the ambassadorship to Great Britain after the death of Queen Anne in 1714.

After his return to Spain, he became the King's Lieutenant of Madrid in September 1714. In 1718 he was an associate of Peter Redmond, and he was sent to Sweden and Russia to try to form an anti-British alliance. Between 1720 and 1725, he served as Philip's ambassador to France. After that, he was captain-general general of Majorca and Ibiza, and governor of Palma de Mallorca, where he died in 1739.
