= Victoria Davia-Montecuculi =

Anna Victoria Davia-Montecuculi
- Countess of Almond
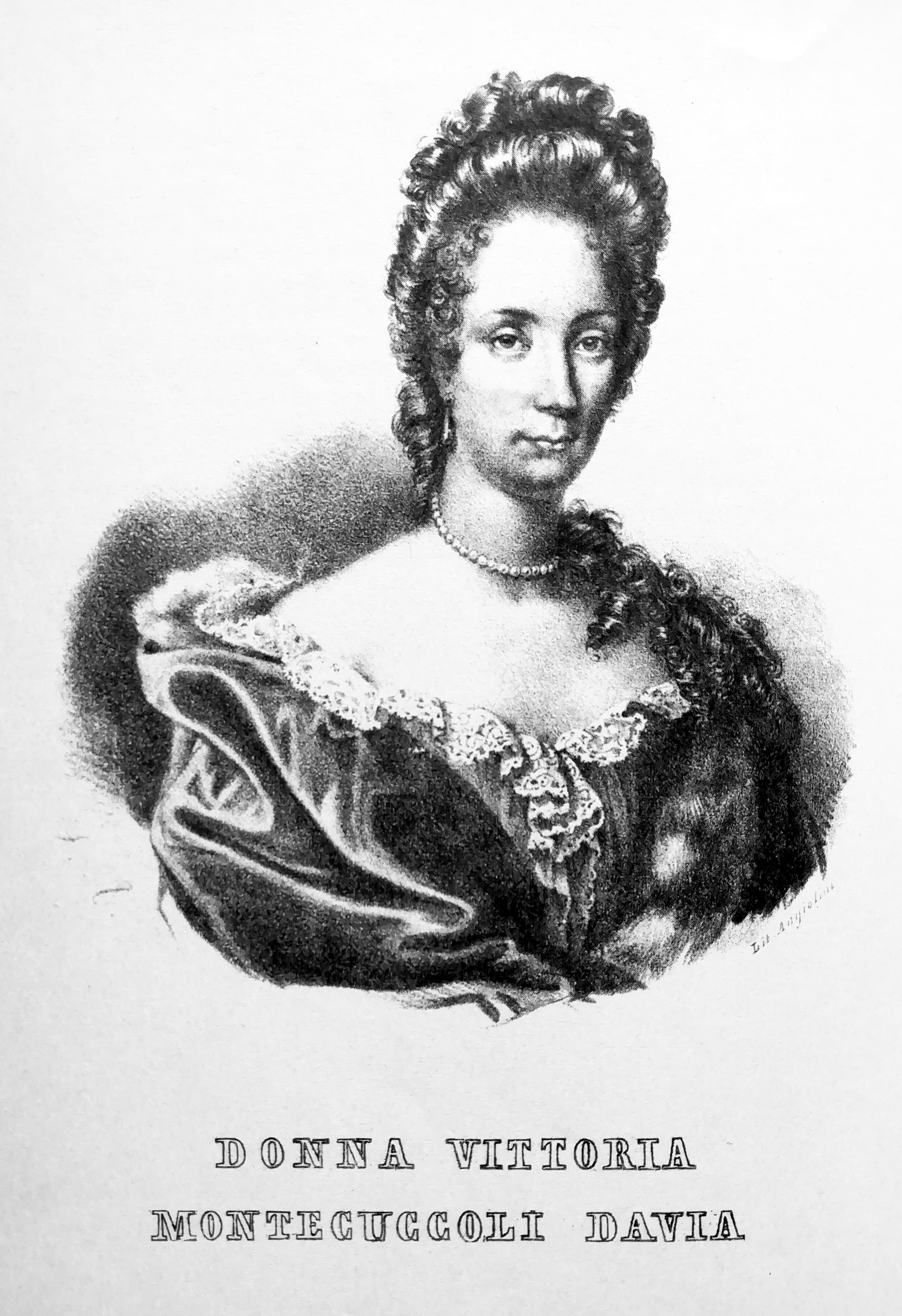
- The Countess of Almond
- Born: 20 June 1655; Modena, Duchy of Modena and Reggio
- Died: 13 April 1703 (aged 47); Château de Saint-Germain-en-Laye, Kingdom of France
- Spouse: Virgilio Giuseppe Davia (m.1672)
- Father: Giovanni Battista Montecuccoli-Laderchi
- Occupation: Courtier

Donna Anna Victoria Davia-Montecuculi (20 June 1655 – 13 April 1703), known as the Countess of Almond from 1689, was a Modenese noblewoman, courtier and companion of Mary of Modena during her time as Queen of England, Scotland and Ireland, and later during her exile in France.

== Early life ==
Born Maria Vittoria Luigia Sigismonda Montecuccoli-Laderchi, she was the daughter of Giovanni Battista Montecuccoli-Laderchi, 2nd Marquis of Guiglia. As a child she was chosen by Duchess consort Laura Martinozzi as her lady-in-waiting, and then as a lady in waiting to her daughter, Maria d'Este (Mary of Modena), the future wife of James, Duke of York. In 1672 Victoria married Virgilio Giuseppe Davia, a Senator of Bologna, and moved with him to that city.

== Courtier in England ==
In September 1673, Victoria and her husband travelled to Modena to "attest obsequious affection" to Mary prior to her departure to England.

During the Exclusion Crisis, Victoria and Virgilio moved to Brussels to attend on Mary during James' temporary exile from England. Victoria was also with the royal couple in Edinburgh in 1684 while James was serving as Lord High Commissioner to the Parliament of Scotland, but she had returned to Modena by the time of James' accession to the throne in February 1685.

The new Queen recalled Victoria to her service and she travelled to the royal court in London later in 1685 with her brother, Raimondo, 3rd Marquis of Guiglia.

== Courtier in France ==
On 9 December 1688 she accompanied Queen Mary and the infant Prince of Wales in their escape from London during the Glorious Revolution. Under the arrangements of Antoine Nompar de Caumont, Victoria disguised herself to avoid recognition and escaped to France, joining the exiled Stuart court at Château de Saint-Germain-en-Laye as a lady in waiting. She was rewarded for her loyalty to the Queen when James II created her suo jure Countess of Almond in the Jacobite peerage on 13 January 1689.

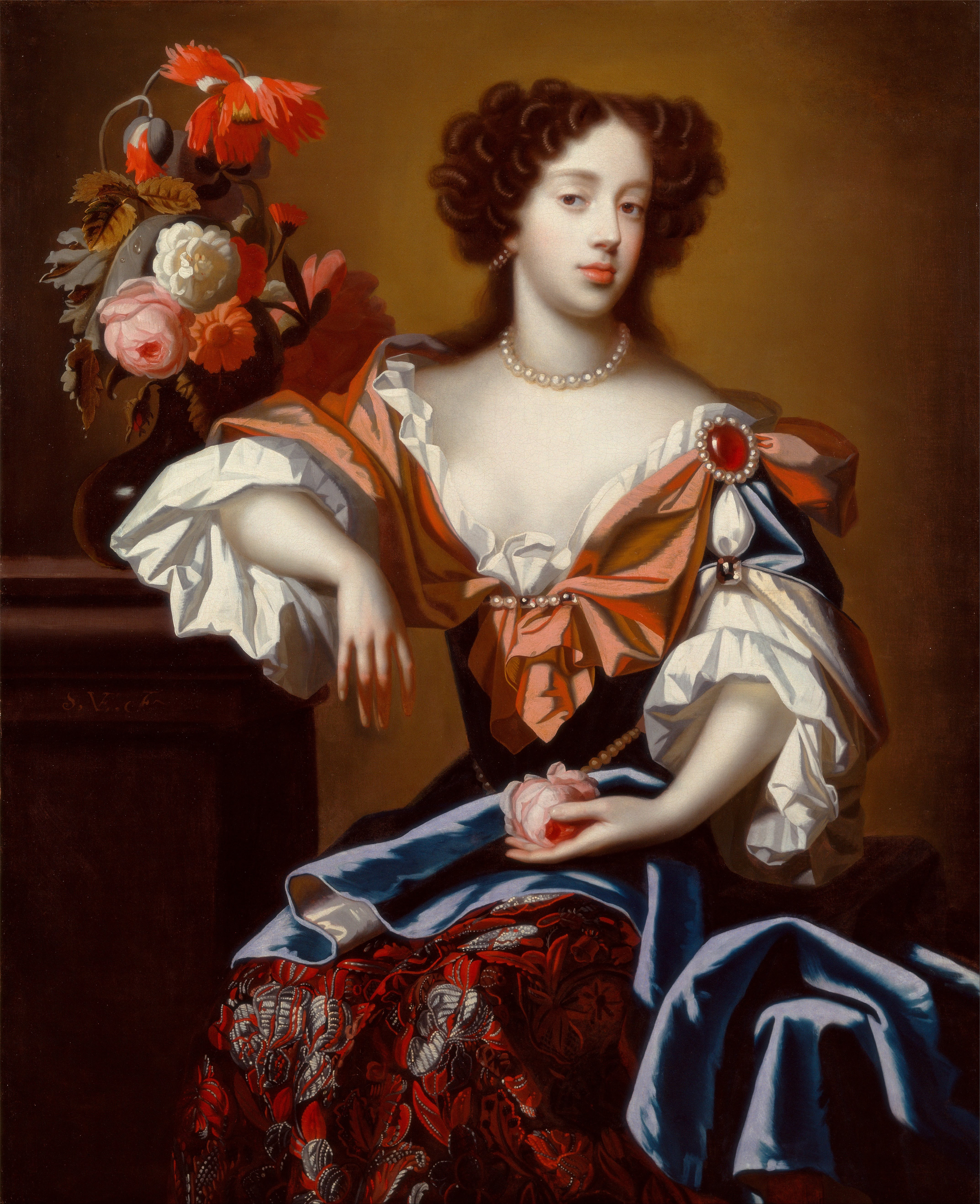
Mary of Modena, to whom Victoria was a loyal companion and servant

Victoria's presence at the French court was disliked by many of Louis XIV's courtiers, owing to her family's loyalty to France's rivals, the Habsburg monarchy. Queen Mary, however, insisted that Victoria remain in her household. The French diplomat François Pidou de Saint Olon was charged with keeping Victoria under observation whenever she was visited by Italians.

In 1692, her son, Giovanni Battista Davia, had left to serve as adjutant-general to his uncle, the Austrian field marshal Aeneas de Caprara. He was captured by the forces of Mustafa II and imprisoned in Constantinople. Victoria attempted to secure French support for his release through Madame de Maintenon, but this did not come to fruition. Eventually, Victoria appealed directly to the Sultan, who released Giovanni after four years imprisonment. However, he died soon after his release in December 1696.

On 12 April 1698, Victoria's husband was made Earl of Almond, Viscount of Moneydie and Lord Davia in the Jacobite peerage of Scotland, in recognition of Victoria's continued service. The preamble to the letters patent state that the titles were awarded for Victoria's "extraordinary merits" and that she had "redoubled her endeavours to be still more and more useful in performing all the duties of a faithful servant passionately concerned in whatsoever regarded the Queen's service and person". Victoria was a witness to the death of James II on 16 September 1701 at Saint-Germain-en-Laye. On 30 October that year she was appointed Lady of the Bedchamber in Ordinary to the Queen, alongside the Duchess of Perth. She died after a brief illness in 1703, after which the Queen entered a period of prolonged mourning.

Peerage of Scotland
New creation	— TITULAR — Countess of Almond; Jacobite peerage 1689–1703	Extinct
