= Peter Redmond =

Irish-born merchant in Portugal and Jacobite

Peter Redmond (c.1660 – c.1732), also referred to as Sir Peter Redmond and later Lord Redmond in Jacobite circles, was an Irish merchant in Portugal who became involved in Jacobite politics in Europe.

== Biography ==
Redmond, who settled in Portugal, was descended from a County Wexford family of the same name. By 1715 he had made a considerable fortune in trade between England and Portugal and had been made a Knight of the Military Order of Christ by John V of Portugal. A close associate of the diplomat Patrick Lawless, Redmond offered his services to the exiled James Francis Edward Stuart, intending to use his fortune to help fund the Jacobite rising of 1715 which ended in failure before Redmond could travel to Scotland. He was knighted by the Old Pretender and created a baronet on 20 December 1717. In early 1718 was appointed "Consul General for Portugal for King James III and VIII", the leading Jacobite representative in Portugal. On 15 December 1721 Redmond was further created Baron Redmond in the Jacobite peerage.

He had a son, John, born in 1709 and at least five daughters. Redmond was dead by March 1732, but the date of death is uncertain.

Peerage of Ireland
New creation	— TITULAR — Baron Redmond; Jacobite peerage 1721–c.1732	Extinct
Baronetage of Ireland
New creation	— TITULAR — Baronet; Jacobite peerage 1717–c.1732	Extinct
