= Daniel O'Brien (Jacobite) =

Irish Jacobite

Daniel O'Brien (1683–1759) was an Irish Jacobite soldier and diplomat who served in the Irish Brigade of the French Army during the War of the Spanish Succession, rising to the rank of colonel. He is often referred to as Colonel Daniel O'Brien.

== Biography ==
He was appointed Earl of Lismore in the Jacobite peerage, a title that was not formally recognised in his native Kingdom of Ireland. His father Murrough O'Brien originally from Carrigogunnell in County Limerick was also one of the Wild Geese, rising to Major General and briefly commanding Clare's Dragoons.

After the Jacobite claimant James Stuart was forced to leave France for Rome due to the terms of the Anglo-French Alliance, he acted as his agent in Paris replacing his fellow countrymen Arthur Dillion in the role and working alongside Francis Sempill and later George Kelly. He also acted as an emissary to the Russian court of Peter the Great in 1718.

In 1745 he signed the Treaty of Fontainebleau which committed France to support the Jacobite Rising that year. From 1747 onwards he was Secretary of State, effectively chief minister to James in his Roman exile. He died in 1759 and was succeeded by his son James Daniel O'Brien (1736–1780) in his Jacobite title.

== Bibliography ==
- Massue, Melville Henry. The Jacobite Peerage, Baronetage, Knightage, and Grants of Honour. Genealogical Publishing, 2003.
- Miller, Peggy. James. George Allen & Unwin, 1971.
- Wills, Rebecca. The Jacobites and Russia, 1715–1750. Dundurn, 2002.

Peerage of Ireland
New creation	— TITULAR — Earl of Lismore; Jacobite peerage 1746–1718	Succeeded by James Daniel O'Brien
Political offices
Preceded by James Murray	Jacobite Secretary of State; 1747–1759	Succeeded by John Graeme
