= Oglethorpe =

Oglethorpe may refer to:

People

- Oglethorpe (surname)

Places

- Bramham cum Oglethorpe, West Yorkshire, England
- Brookhaven/Oglethorpe (MARTA station), a passenger rail station located in the Brookhaven neighborhood of Atlanta, Georgia
- Mount Oglethorpe, Georgia
- Oglethorpe County, Georgia
- Oglethorpe, Georgia
- Oglethorpe University, Atlanta, Georgia
- Oglethorpe Charter School in Savannah, Georgia
- Oglethorpe Mall, a shopping mall in Savannah, Georgia
- Military

- Camp Oglethorpe, a prisoner of war camp near Macon, Georgia, maintained by the Confederates during the American Civil War
- Oglethorpe Barracks, 19th century Army post, Savannah, Georgia
- Fort Oglethorpe, Georgia, the town
- Fort Oglethorpe (Fort Oglethorpe, Georgia), Army base founded in 1904
- Fort Oglethorpe, GA (Prisoner-of-war-Camp), a POW camp during World War I
- Fort James Jackson, fort built during 1808-1812 that protected Savannah, Georgia and was also known as Fort Oglethorpe

Other Uses

- Quercus oglethorpensis, also called Oglethorpe Oak, a species of plant found in the Piedmont of Georgia and South Carolina, and in Louisiana and Mississippi
- USS Oglethorpe (AKA-100), an Andromeda-class attack cargo ship in service from 1945 to 1968
- See List of NASCAR race tracks for Oglethorpe Speedway Park, a NASCAR race track in Pooler, Georgia
- Oglethorpe Power, an electric power company headquartered in Tucker, Georgia
- Change at Oglethorpe, a radio program that aired on BBC Radio 2
- Oglethorpe, a recurring character from Aqua Teen Hunger Force
- Bo Buchanan, Beaufort Oglethorpe "Bo" Buchanan, a fictional character on the soap opera One Life to Live
