= Earl of Melfort =

The titles of Viscount of Melfort and Lord Drummond of Gillestoun were created in the Peerage of Scotland on 14 April 1685 for John Drummond, second son of James Drummond, 3rd Earl of Perth, with remainder to the heirs male of his body by his second marriage, to Euphemia Wallace, failing whom to the heirs male of his body whatsoever. He was further created, on 12 August 1686, Earl of Melfort, Viscount of Forth and Lord Drummond of Riccartoun, Castlemains and Gilstoun, also in the peerage of Scotland, and with a similar remainder.

A supporter of King James II and VII, Melfort escaped to France on 16 December 1688, following the "Glorious Revolution" which installed William of Orange and Mary II on the English and Scottish thrones. Drummond was further created Baron Cleworth in the Jacobite Peerage of England by the exiled monarch, on 7 August 1689, and Duke of Melfort, Marquess of Forth, Earl of Isla and Burntisland, Viscount of Rickerton and Lord Castlemains and Galston in the Jacobite Peerage of Scotland 17 April 1692, all with a similar remainder to the 1685 viscountcy.

The 1st Earl and titular 1st Duke of Melfort was outlawed by the de facto régime in England on 23 July 1694 and was attainted by Act of Parliament on 2 July 1695, when his honours became forfeit. In 1701, after the death of James II and VII, the Duke of Melfort was granted the honours and precedence of a French peer by Louis XIV. He and his descendants used the title "Duc de Melfort" in France, but this was a French translation of their Jacobite dukedom and not a French dukedom. The dukedom was never recognised by the governments of England and later of Great Britain.

On 2 July 1800 the titular 4th Duke of Melfort succeeded as heir male to the attainted Earldom of Perth and as titular 9th Duke of Perth, Marquess of Drummond, Earl of Stobhall, Viscount of Cargill and Lord Concraig, on the death of his second cousin once removed, James Drummond, Lord Perth and Baron Drummond of Stobhall, a descendant of the 1st Earl and Duke of Melfort from his first marriage, to Sophie Maitland. In 1841 the titular 6th Duke of Melfort established his right before the French Council of State and the Tribunal de la Seine to the French titles of Duc de Melfort, Comte de Lussan and Baron de Valrose (his great-grandfather the 2nd Duke of Melfort had been married in 1707 to Marie Gabrielle d'Audebert, widow of the Duke of Albemarle and only daughter of Jean d'Audebert, Comte de Lussan). The titular 6th Duke of Melfort proved to the incumbent British authorities his descent from the 1st Earl of Melfort in 1848, and by a reversal of his ancestors' attainder on 28 June 1853 became 5th Earl of Perth and Lord Drummond of Stobhall, Earl of Melfort, Viscount of Forth and Lord Drummond of Riccartoun, Castlemains and Gilstoun, Viscount of Melfort and Lord Drummond of Gillestoun and Lord Drummond of Cargill. He died on 28 February 1902, when the Melfort titles became dormant or extinct and the Perth titles passed to the Viscount of Strathallan.

== Viscounts (1685), Earls (1686) and titular Dukes (1692) of Melfort ==
- John Drummond, 1st Duke of Melfort (1650–1714), attainted 1695
- John Drummond, 2nd Duke of Melfort (1682–1754)
- James Drummond, 3rd Duke of Melfort (1708–1766)
- James Louis Drummond, 4th Duke of Melfort (1750–1800)
- Charles Edouard Drummond, 5th Duke of Melfort (1752–1840)
- George Drummond, 5th Earl of Perth (1807–1902), restored 1853
