= Lord of Clanranald =

- Blazon: Gules two bars Or.
- Creation date: 28 September 1716
- Created by: James VIII & III
- Peerage: Peerage of Scotland (Jacobite peerage)
- First holder: Ranald Macdonald
- Present holder: Ranald Alexander Macdonald, 10th Lord of Clanranald
- Heir apparent: Ranald Angus Macdonald of Clanranald, Master of Clanranald
- Seat: Castle Tioram (historically)
- Motto: My hope is constant in thee

Lord of Clanranald refers to the Lordship of Clanranald in the Jacobite Peerage. On 28 September 1716 Ranald Macdonald, 15th chief of Clanranald, was created a Lord and Peer of Parliament as Lord of Clanranald, with remainder to his heirs male. On the same date, his sister-in-law Penelope Louisa, née Mackenzie, the widow of his brother Allan, 14th chief of Clanranald, was created Lady Clanranald, also in the Jacobite Peerage.

As of 2009, the holder of the title created for the 15th chief is Ranald Alexander Macdonald, titular 10th Lord of Clanranald, 24th Chief and Captain of Clanranald.
