= Henry FitzJames =

Illegitimate son of James II of England

- Duke of Albemarle
- Born: 6 August 1673; St. James's Square, Westminster, Middlesex, England
- Died: 16 December 1702 (aged 29); Bagnols sur Cèze, Languedoc, France
- Noble family: FitzJames
- Spouse: Marie Gabrielle d'Audibert de Lussan
- Issue: Lady Christine Marie Jacqueline Henriette FitzJames
- Father: James II of England
- Mother: Arabella Churchill

Henry FitzJames (6 August 1673 – 16 December 1702), titular 1st Duke of Albemarle in the Jacobite peerage, was an illegitimate son of King James II of England and VII of Scotland by Arabella Churchill, sister of the first Duke of Marlborough.

== Life ==
FitzJames was born in St. James's Square, Westminster, then in the county of Middlesex, England, during the reign of his uncle, Charles II. He was the younger brother of James FitzJames, 1st Duke of Berwick, the French Marshal. He was also the brother of Henrietta FitzJames and Arabella FitzJames, who was named after her mother and became a nun. FitzJames was raised in France and educated at the College of Juilly and the Collège Henri-IV. In 1687, at the age of thirteen, he was sent to England to gain military experience aboard HMS Sedgemoor, named after his father's recent victory.

Following the Glorious Revolution in 1688, FitzJames followed his father into exile in France. At the age of sixteen, his father made FitzJames the colonel of a regiment of infantry, which he led at the Battle of the Boyne in 1690 during the Williamite War in Ireland. In 1695, he was outlawed by the English government. The following year he was put in command of a fleet at Toulon, which had been given over by the French to the exiled King James to invade England; the planned invasion never took place. In 1702, Louis XIV made FitzJames an admiral and a lieutenant-general in the French Royal Army, although he died at the age of 29 later that year.

On 20 July 1700, he had married Marie Gabrielle d'Audibert de Lussan, daughter and heiress of Jean d'Audibert, Comte de Lussan and Marie Françoise Raimond. He had a posthumous daughter, Lady Christine Marie Jacqueline Henriette FitzJames, born 29 May 1703 at Bagnols sur Cèze, Languedoc, France, who became a nun. His widow remarried in May 1707, at Saint-Germain-en-Laye, John Drummond, Marquess of Forth, later 2nd Duke of Melfort (1682–1754).

=== Unrecognized (in England) title ===
FitzJames was created Duke of Albemarle, together with the subsidiary titles of Earl of Rochford and Baron Romney, by his father on 13 January 1696, but the title was only recognized by Jacobites and the Kingdom of France. His titles became extinct upon his death. He was also appointed the Grand Prior of England of the revived English Langue of the Sovereign Military Order of St. John of Jerusalem, Rhodes and Malta, known as the Knights of Malta.

== Ancestry ==
Ancestors of Henry FitzJames

8. James I of England
4. Charles I of England
9. Anne of Denmark
2. James II of England
10. Henry IV of France
5. Henrietta Maria of France
11. Marie de' Medici
1. Henry FitzJames, 1st Duke of Albemarle
12. John Churchill
6. Winston Churchill
13. Sarah Winston
3. Arabella Churchill
14. John Drake
7. Elizabeth Drake
15. Eleanor Boteler

Peerage of England
New creation	— TITULAR — Duke of Albemarle; Jacobite peerage 1696–1702	Extinct
