= Edward Chevers =

Edward Chevers (died 1709), known as Viscount Mount Leinster from 1689, was an Irish Jacobite soldier and peer.

== Biography ==
Chevers was the son of John Chevers of Macetown and Joan Sutton. He married Anne Sarsfield, daughter of Patrick Sarsfield and sister of the Jacobite Earl of Lucan.

Following the Glorious Revolution, Chevers remained loyal to King James II. On 23 August 1689 he was made Viscount Mount Leinster of County Carlow and Baron Bannow of County Wexford in the Jacobite peerage of Ireland. He served in the Jacobite army in Ireland and was aide-de-camp to James II at the Battle of the Boyne in 1690. Despite being specifically included in Article 4 of the Treaty of Limerick, Chivers voluntary relinquished the benefits of the capitulation and followed James II into exile. He died in France in 1709 without male heirs. He was the uncle of Augustine Cheevers.

Peerage of Ireland
New creation	— TITULAR — Viscount Mount Leinster; Jacobite peerage 1689–1709	Extinct
