= Thomas Sheridan (Jacobite) =

Jacobite courtier and conspirator (1684–1746)

Sir Thomas Sheridan (1684–1746) was a Jacobite courtier and conspirator of Anglo-Irish background, known mainly for his role as an advisor to Charles Edward Stuart during the Jacobite rising of 1745.

== Life ==
Sheridan was the eldest child of former Chief Secretary for Ireland Thomas Sheridan and his wife Helen Appleby. Appleby was the daughter of Thomas Appleby of Linton-on-Ouse, Yorkshire, although she was rumoured by contemporaries to be an illegitimate child of James II, and the Sheridans were consistent supporters of Stuart interests. They were an old Irish family originally from County Cavan; Sheridan's grandfather, Dionysius or Denis Sheridan, had converted to Protestantism in his youth and became vicar of Killasher under the patronage of Bishop Bedell. The extended family were part of a relict group of Protestant Ormondist Tories who continued to adhere to the Jacobite cause in Ireland. Following the 1688 deposition of James II, Sheridan's father joined the Jacobite court in exile in France.

In 1710, Sheridan studied law at the Middle Temple, but later became involved in the Jacobite rising of 1715 as a courier. He was afterwards given a variety of conspiratorial or diplomatic missions on behalf of the Jacobite court, including the channeling of correspondence between Ireland and France.

In 1725, he was appointed governor to Charles Stuart; Charles developed a close and affectionate relationship with Sheridan, and often sought his advice in later years. He was created a baronet in the Jacobite peerage in March 1726. During the 1745 rising Sheridan, despite poor health–he suffered from asthma and had already had one stroke - was one of the initial seven companions of the Prince, the "Seven Men of Moidart". Along with John O'Sullivan he was the subject of repeated complaints, from the Scottish Jacobite leadership, of Irish influence on Charles. After the failure of the rising he returned to France. He died in Rome in 1746.

Many details of Sheridan's life remain obscure. Some modern sources claim that he was in his seventies in 1745 and was a veteran of the Boyne, though this is unlikely, and he is variously described as a Catholic, a Protestant, or (like his father) as a Catholic convert. O'Callaghan and a number of other sources describe Michael Sheridan, an Irish Brigade officer who was involved in parts of the 1745 Rising, as Sheridan's son, though he is elsewhere described as his nephew.
