= David Nairne =

David Nairne (August 1655 – 1740), also known as Sir David Nairne, Baronet, was a Scottish Jacobite who served at the courts of the exiled Stuart kings James II and James Francis Edward Stuart in France.

== Biography ==
Nairne was the son of Sir Thomas Nairne, of Sandfurd and Margaret Barclay. Nairne followed James II into exile following the Jacobite defeat in the War of the Two Kings and became his servant at Château de Saint-Germain-en-Laye. From 1689 to 1713 he served as Under Secretary of State at various intervals, becoming a central figure in the administration of Jacobite politics. He enjoyed a close relationship with James and conducted Jacobite correspondence, decided on Jacobite policies and negotiated with the friendly courts of Versailles, Lunéville and Rome. Nairne became one of James' closest advisors.

After James II's death in 1701, he remained an important figure in the court of James's son, the Old Pretender. From 1706 to 1713 he was Clerk of the King's Council and was Secretary of the Closet for the King's private letters and dispatches between 1713 and 1733. He was made a baronet in the Jacobite peerage on 7 February 1719. The survival of his papers and correspondence provide a comprehensive account of the exiled Jacobite court in France. In June 1735 his daughter, Marie Nairne, married the Jacobite Andrew Michael Ramsay. Nairne died in France, likely in early 1740.
