= Francis Cottington (Jacobite) =

English Jacobite landowner

Francis Cottington (c.1685 – 8 September 1728), titular Lord Cottington from 1716, was an English landowner and Jacobite.

== Biography ==
Cottington was the eldest son and heir of Charles Cottington (died 1697) of Fonthill Gifford, Wiltshire, by his first wife, Alithea. He was a great-great-nephew of Francis Cottington, 1st Baron Cottington, a Roman Catholic who was Lord High Treasurer to Charles I during the English Civil War. He was also a nephew of the Catholic peer Lord Stourton. Born into a recusant family, Cottington was also raised as a Catholic. He was a minor when his father died and he inherited extensive estates in Berkshire, Wiltshire and Somerset; he had likely reached majority by 1706.

In 1708 he married Hellen Golding, the only daughter of Sir Edward Golding, 3rd Baronet of Colston Bassett in Nottinghamshire. The Goldings were prominent Catholics and the marriage brought new money into the Cottington family.

In 1716, Cottington was made Baron Cottington of Fonthill Gifford in the Jacobite peerage by the exiled James Francis Edward Stuart, possibly in gratitude for Cottington providing financial support to the Stuarts during the failed Jacobite rising of 1715. Cottington was among the Catholics who refused to take the oath of loyalty to George I after the rebellion, and consequently he was required to register his name and estates in the government list under the Papists Act 1716. In 1719 he was in Padua with his brother, John.

Cottington lived in the mansion of the Fonthill Gifford estate during the early part of his adult life, and later had another household at West Wycombe, Buckinghamshire. He died at his West Wycombe house in 1728, six days after his wife's death, and was succeeded in his estates and Jacobite title by his son, Francis.

Peerage of England
New creation	— TITULAR — Baron Cottington of Fonthill Gifford; Jacobite peerage 1716–1728	Succeeded by Francis Cottington
