= Richard Warren (Jacobite) =

Irish Jacobite who helped Bonnie Prince Charlie escape Scotland

Colonel Richard Augustus Warren (1705–1775), also known as Sir Richard Warren, was an Irish Jacobite soldier who served in the French Irish Brigade and in the Jacobite rising of 1745. He led the naval mission to rescue Charles Edward Stuart from Scotland in 1746.

== Biography ==
Warren was born at Corduff, County Dublin in 1705, the son of John Warren and Mary Jones. The family's financial situation compelled Warren to emigrate to France, where he briefly worked as a merchant in Marseille. In 1744 he became a volunteer captain in the French Royal Army, joining an Irish regiment and fighting at the Battle of Fontenoy. He was commissioned by Louis XV to lead two ships of French reinforcements for the 1745 Jacobite rising, landing at Stonehaven in October 1745 with soldiers for the army of Prince Charles, the Young Pretender. Charles promoted Warren to Colonel after observing his construction of battery defences at Perth and Warren became aide-de-camp to General Lord George Murray. He was present at the Siege of Carlisle before returning to France to source further reinforcements. In gratitude for the news, and for the safe delivery of several prisoners captured at the battle, the French court awarded him the rank of colonel, and he was made a knight of the Order of Saint Louis.

=== Rescue of Charles Edward Stuart ===
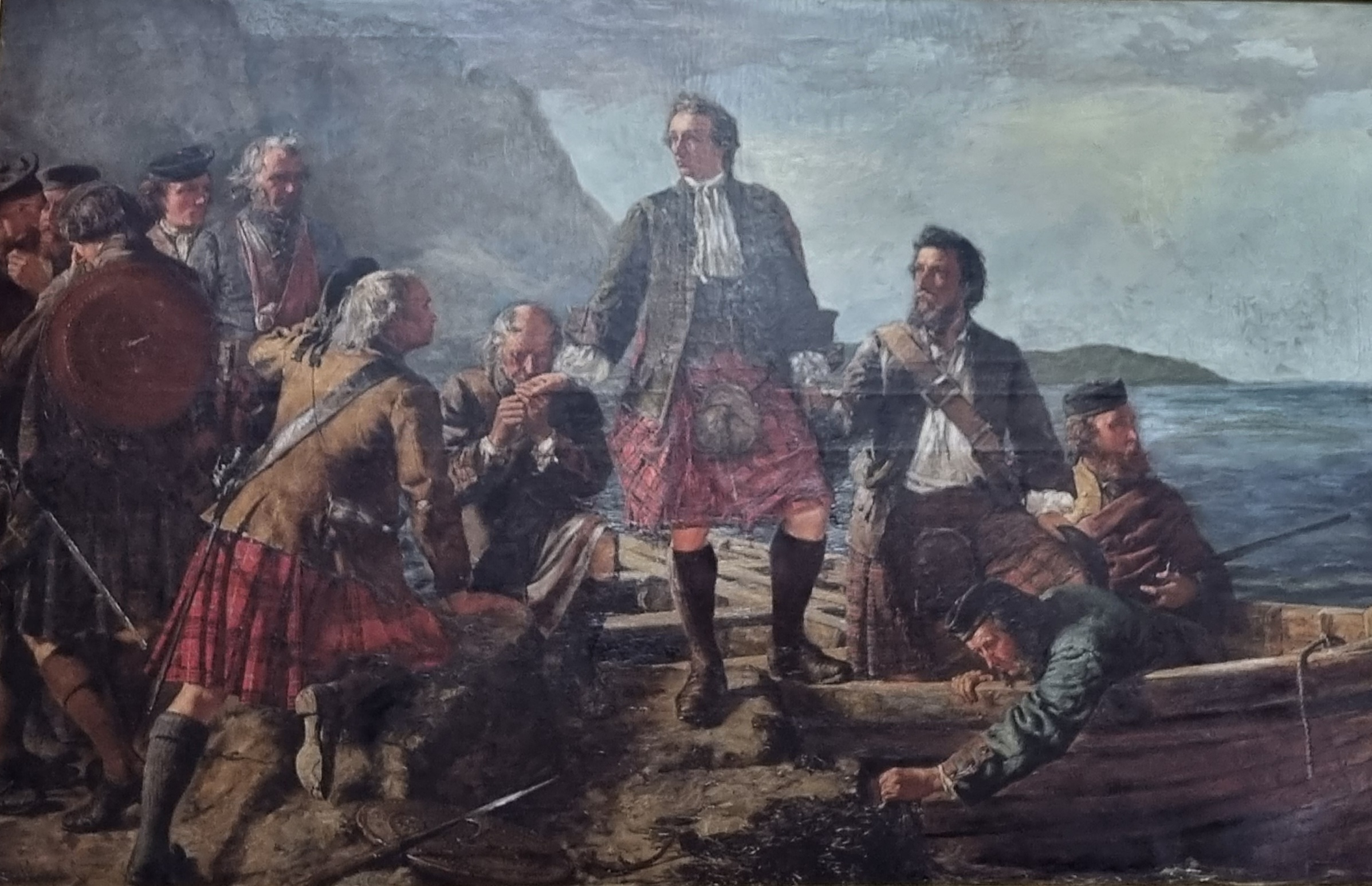
An 1863 painting depicting Prince Charles leaving Scotland with Richard Warren

Following the Jacobite defeat at the Battle of Culloden in April 1746, Warren volunteered to lead the mission to rescue Prince Charles from Scotland. Departing from Saint-Malo on 31 August with two French ships, Le Prince de Conti and L’Heureux, he landed at Loch nan Uamh in the Sound of Arisaig on 6 September. After three weeks of searching, the Prince and his small group of supporters were found and Warren departed with them on 30 September. Warren's ships landed at Roscoff in north west France on 10 October. On 3 November 1746 James Francis Edward Stuart made Warren a baronet in the Jacobite peerage for "gallant service"; however he was only allowed to use this title publicly after 1751.

=== French service ===
Warren returned to French service and became aide-de-camp to Marshall Maurice de Saxe. In 1750 he was made "brigadier general of the English troops" as a reward for his loyalty to the Jacobite cause. He visited London in 1751 and was included on a list of proposed attainders for Jacobite rebels in 1752. On the outbreak of the Seven Years' War in 1756 he was appointed brigadier of infantry in the French army and was given command of the Irish Brigade. In 1762 he became a Maréchal de camp and soon after a French subject.

He died unmarried and heavily in debt in 1775, having unsuccessfully petitioned the Stuarts for a Jacobite peerage.
