= Toby Bourke (Jacobite) =

Irish Jacobite courtier, agent and diplomat

Theobald Bourke (1675–12 May 1742), also known as Toby Bourke and Tobias du Bourk, was an Irish Jacobite courtier, agent and diplomat.

== Biography ==
Bourke was born at Shanid, County Limerick, the son of Richard Bourke and his wife Silena O'Brien. He was from a Roman Catholic family and in 1688 he was sent to be educated at the Irish College in Bordeaux. After the conclusion of the Williamite War in Ireland, Bourke travelled to the exiled Stuart court at Château de Saint-Germain-en-Laye. He enlisted in the Irish Brigade and fought in the Nine Years' War, before securing employment in the household of Cardinal de Bouillon, the French ambassador to Rome.

In 1702 he was knighted and made a baronet by the Old Pretender, James Francis Edward Stuart, who appointed him as a gentleman of the privy chamber in January 1704. In 1705, the Jacobite Queen Regent, Mary of Modena, appointed Bourke as the Jacobite ambassador to Philip V of Spain. In Madrid he became the leading agent of Jacobite activity in Spain, assisting in the affairs of Irish emigres and exiles, such as James Butler, 2nd Duke of Ormonde, and facilitating the entry of men into the Regiment of Hibernia. In 1705 he also became an informant for the French diplomat, the Marquess of Torcy, to whom Bourke sent detailed written reports twice a year in return for an annual subsidy of 6,000 francs from Louis XIV.

The Peace of Utrecht in 1713 saw relations deteriorate between the Jacobite and Spanish courts, but Bourke continued to reside in Spain. In 1715, the Spanish diplomat Giulio Alberoni commissioned Bourke to conduct an embassy to Charles XII of Sweden, but the mission was later abandoned. The Spanish refused to reimburse Bourke for the task, despite the capture of his wife and children by the British admiral George Byng while they were sailing to Sweden. He subsequently joined the exiled Stuart court in Rome and in February 1727, Bourke was raised to the Jacobite peerage as Baron Bourke. He had returned to Spain by 1739 and died in that country in 1742.

Peerage of Ireland
New creation	— TITULAR — Baron Bourke; Jacobite peerage 1727–1742	Unknown
