= Secretary of State (Jacobite) =

Jacobite official

The secretary of state was one of the senior ministers of the Jacobite court in exile following the Glorious Revolution of 1688.

Jacobite monarchs in-exile

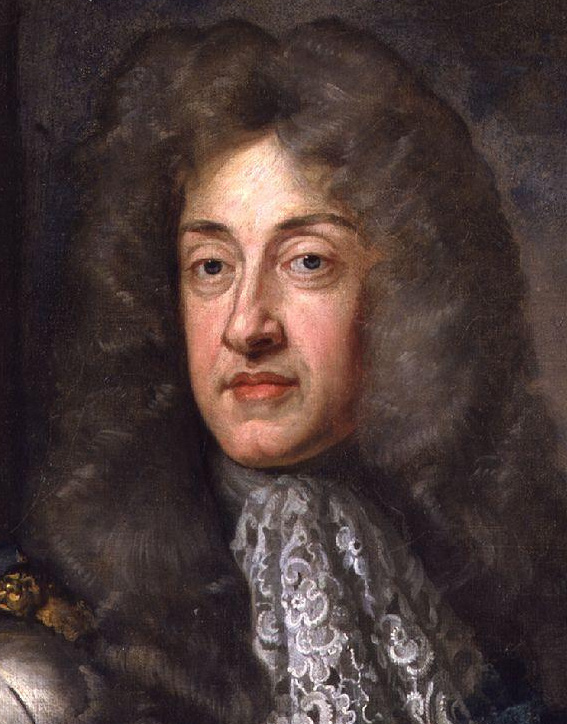
King James II & VII

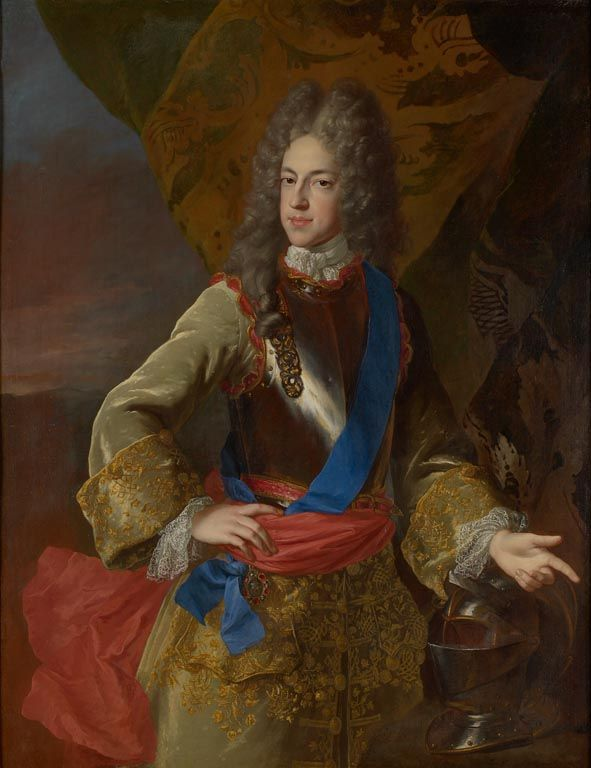
King James III & VIII

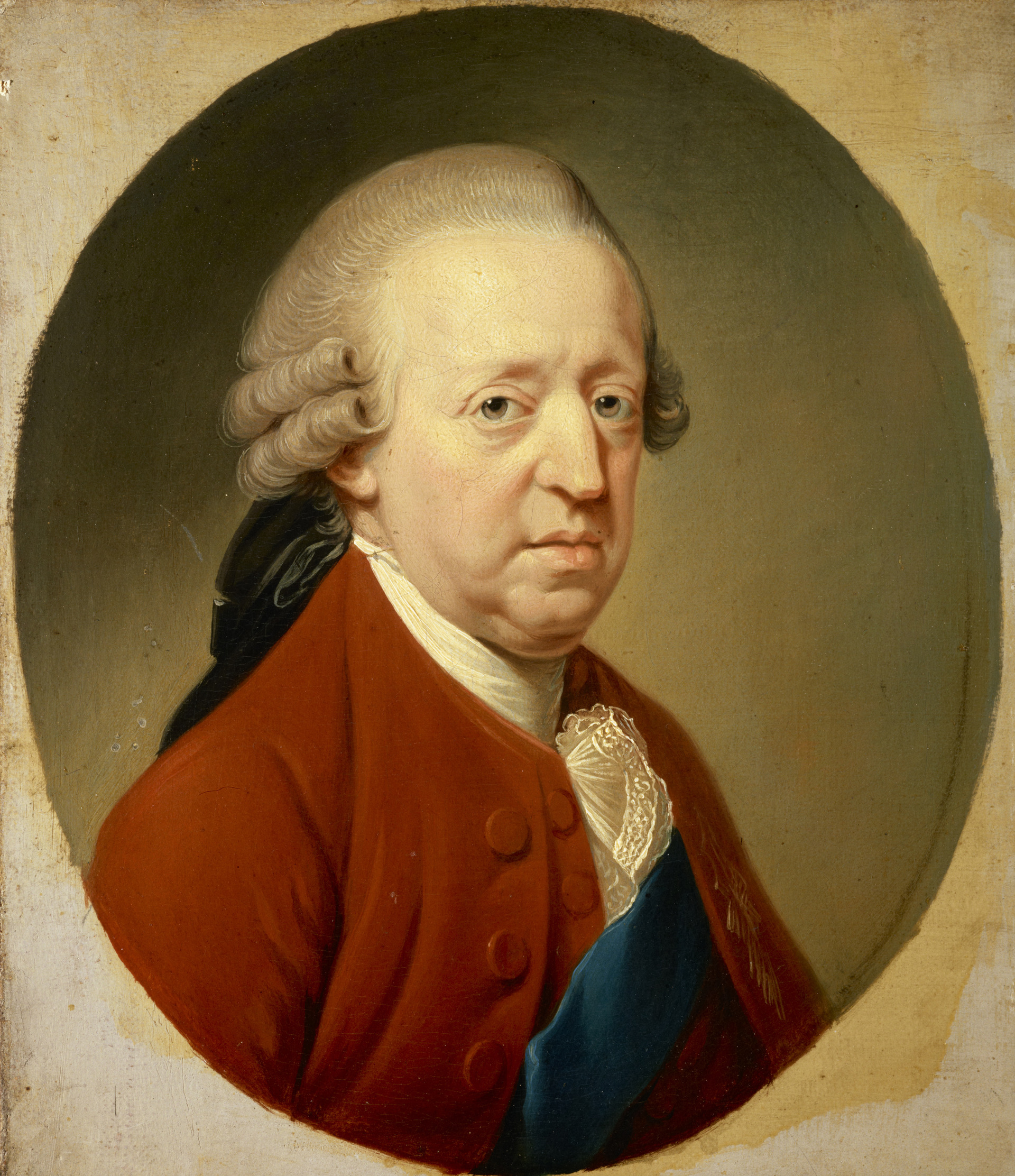
King Charles III

In common with Jacobite attempts to create a shadow court in exile that matched that in London, the role was based on the British position of secretary of state. In London, the role had been split into two: Northern Secretary and Southern Secretary. At the Jacobite court in exile, first in Paris and then in Rome, the claimants alternated between having one or two secretaries of state. From 1689 to 1759 a series of unsuccessful attempts were made to invade Britain which would have restored the secretaries' effective power.

Residences

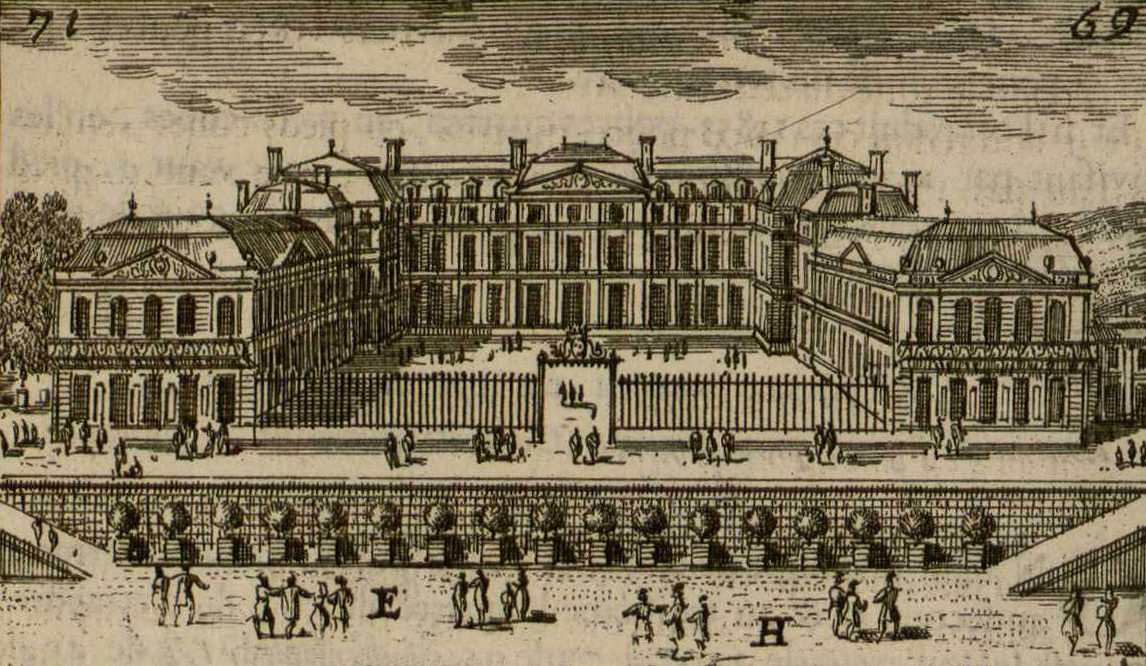
Château de Saint-Germain-en-Laye, France

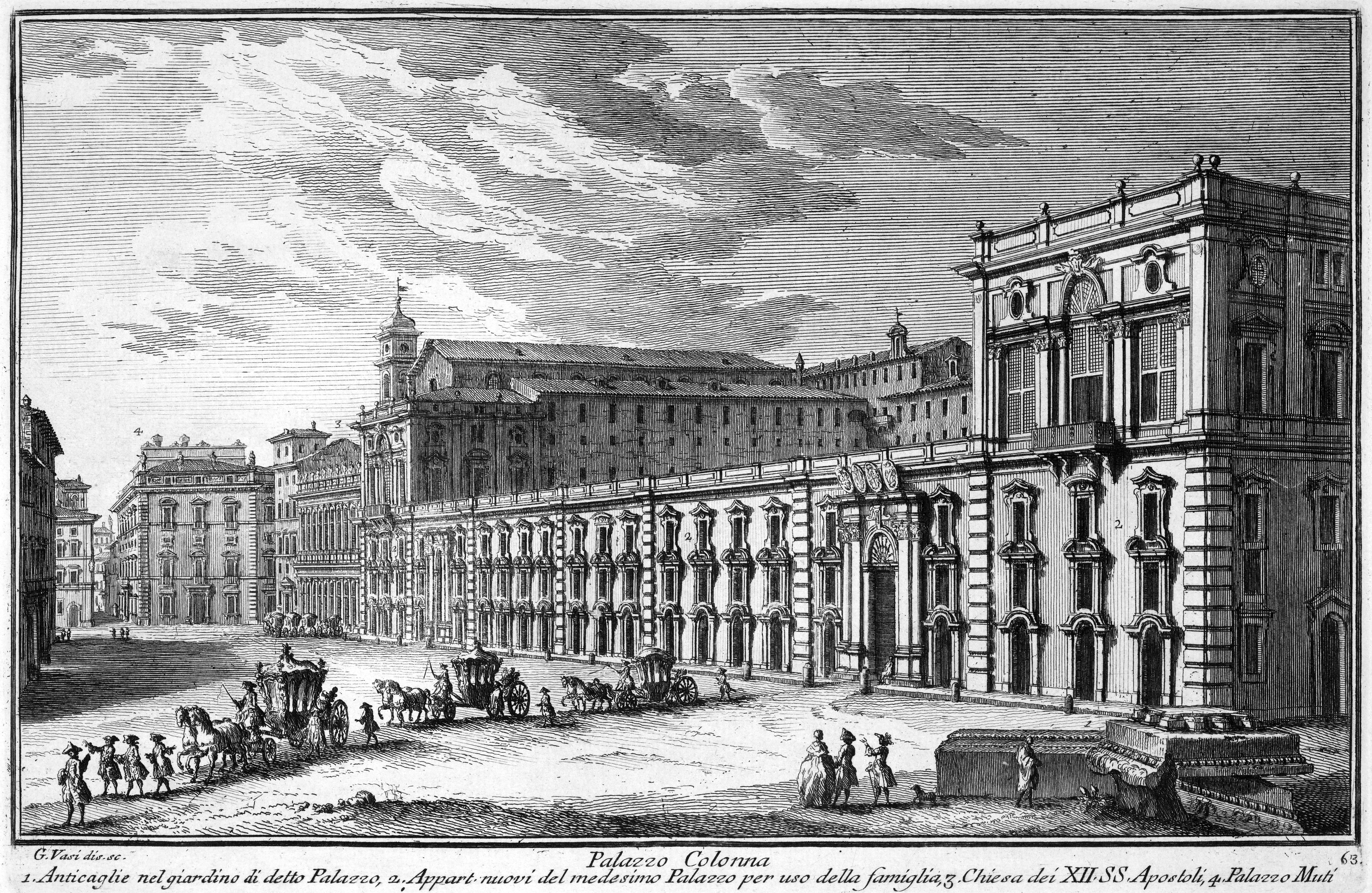
Palazzo Muti, Rome, Italy

== Selected list of holders ==
Image	Secretary	From	To	Jacobite claimant
	John Drummond, 1st Earl of Melfort	1688	1694	James II & VII
	Charles Middleton, 2nd Earl of Middleton	1693	1713	James II & VII / James III & VIII
	Thomas Higgons	1713	1715	James III & VIII
	Henry St John, 1st Viscount Bolingbroke	1715	1716	James III & VIII
	John Erskine, Earl of Mar	1716	1724	James III & VIII
	John Hay, Duke of Inverness	1724	1727	James III & VIII
	John Graeme, Earl of Alford	1727	1728	James III & VIII
	James Murray, Earl of Dunbar	1728	1747	James III & VIII
	Daniel O'Brien, Earl of Lismore	1747	1759	James III & VIII
	John Graeme, Earl of Alford	1759	1763	James III & VIII
	James Edgar	1763	1764	James III & VIII
	Andrew Lumisden	1764	1768	James III & VIII / Charles III
	John Baptist Caryll	1768	1777	Charles III

== See also ==
- Secretary of State for Scotland
- Secretary of State (Kingdom of Scotland)
- Secretary of State (England)
- Secretary of State (United Kingdom)

== Bibliography ==
- Melville, Henry Massue Ruvigny Et Raineval. The Jacobite Peerage, Baronetage, Knightage, and Grants of Honour. Genealogical Publishing, 2003.
- Miller, Peggy. James. George Allen & Unwin, 1971.
- Szechi, Daniel. 1715: The Great Jacobite Rebellion. Yale University Press, 2006.
