= James Edgar (Jacobite) =

Scottish Jacobite official

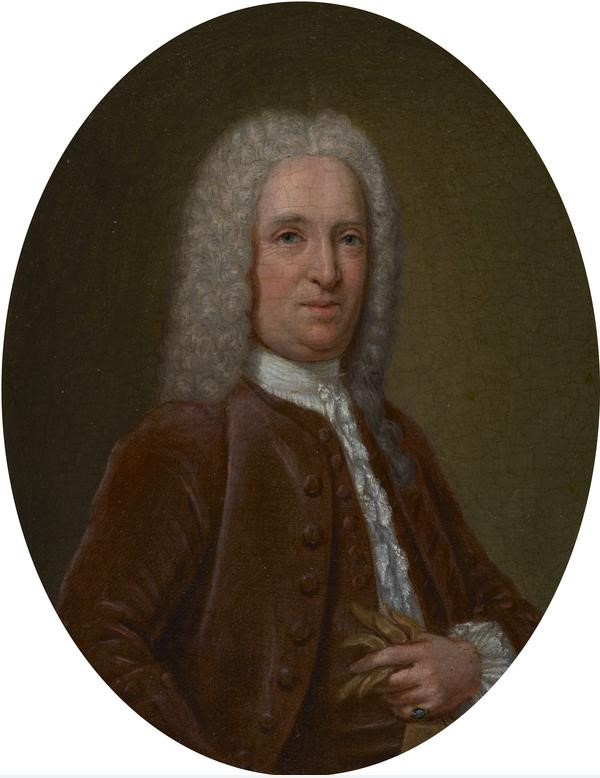
James Edgar. His signet ring shows a cameo profile of James III and VIII

James Edgar (13 July 1688 – 24 September 1764) was a Scottish Jacobite official.

== Biography ==
Edgar was born in Keithock, Forfarshire, the fifth of seven sons of David Edgar, Laird of Keithock, and his second wife, Elizabeth (née Guthrie). Edgar was well-connected; he was the godson of James Maule, 4th Earl of Panmure.

In the Jacobite rising of 1715, Edgar was among the first to rally to the raising of the Jacobite standard at Braemar by the Earl of Mar on 6 September. During the rising he served as clerk to John Hay of Cromlix.

After the defeat of the rising, he escaped Scotland in disguise and joined the exiled Jacobites, first in Avignon by late 1716 and then in Rome by 1717. He never returned to Scotland. By the later 1720s he had assumed increased responsibility for correspondence into and out of the Jacobite court, often composing the bulk of a letter's content while James Francis Edward Stuart attached a signature and occasionally added a few comments. From 1728, he was employed by James Stuart as his private secretary, being chiefly responsible for coordinating intelligence reports for the Jacobite cause. Edgar was involved in much of the Jacobite correspondence of the period and became highly valued by the Old Pretender owing to his efficiency and integrity. Edgar managed to remain impartial and uninvolved in the constant power struggles among the Jacobite supporters at court, thereby maintaining the trust of the Old Pretender and, increasingly, his son Charles Edward Stuart.

From 1732, Edgar assumed many of the responsibilities of the Pretender's Secretary of State, amid growing factionalism and infighting in the exiled court. He was commissioned as clerk of Scotland's Councils, Registers, and Rolls in 1759. In 1763, he was eventually formally appointed as Secretary of State, but succumbed to a stroke little more than a year later in September 1764. Much of his correspondence on behalf of the Jacobite court is now held by the Royal Archives.

Political offices
| Preceded by John Graeme | Jacobite Secretary of State; 1763–1764 | Succeeded by Andrew Lumisden |
