= Paul Monod =

Paul Kléber Monod (born 25 June 1957) is a Canadian-born academic historian specializing in Jacobitism and British history in the 17th and 18th centuries. Since 1984 he has taught at Middlebury College, Vermont, where he is now A. Barton Hepburn Professor of History, and he is the author of a number of books and articles dealing with his period.

== Early life ==
Monod graduated BA from Princeton University in May 1978, then spent a number of years at Yale, graduating MA in 1979, MPhil in 1980, and PhD in 1985. His doctoral dissertation at Yale was entitled The King shall enjoy his own again: English Jacobitism, 1688-1780.

== Career ==
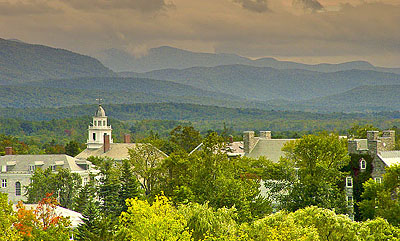
Middlebury

Monod's main teaching career has been at Middlebury College since 1984, when he was appointed as an assistant professor. In 1991 he became an associate professor there and has been the college's A. Barton Hepburn Professor of History since 1996. In 1990–1991 he was a Leverhulme Visiting Fellow at the University of Sussex, between 1993 and 1994 he taught at the summer courses of the Complutense University of Madrid, and he was a visiting lecturer at the Aston Magna Academy at Yale in 1997. In 2000–2001 he was a visiting fellow at Harris Manchester College, Oxford.

His first book, Jacobitism and the English People, 1688-1788 (1989) has been considered "an important monograph", although it has also been criticized for being "overly sympathetic to the Stuart cause."

The Murder of Mr Grebell: Madness and Civility in an English Town (2003) begins with the murder of a justice of the peace in the English port of Rye in 1743, considering its background as far back as the Reformation of the 16th century, then looks at events over the next two hundred years.

His book Solomon's Secret Arts (2013) grew out of work he did in the 1990s on the papers of Samuel Jeake (1623–1690), an astrologer.

== Major publications ==
- The King shall enjoy his own again: English Jacobitism, 1688-1780 (Yale dissertation, 1985)
- Jacobitism and the English People, 1688-1788 (Cambridge University Press, 1989)
- The Power of Kings: Monarchy and Religion in Europe, 1588-1715 (Yale University Press, 1999)
- The Murder of Mr Grebell: Madness and Civility in an English Town (Yale University Press, 2003)
- Imperial Island: a History of Britain and its Empire (Wiley-Blackwell, 2008)
- Loyalty and Identity: Jacobites at Home and Abroad (Palgrave, 2009) (ed., with Murray Pittock and Daniel Szechi)
- Solomon's Secret Arts: The Occult in the Age of Enlightenment (2013)

== Selected articles ==
- 'Jacobitism and Country Principles in the Reign of William III', in The Historical Journal, 30 (1987), pp. 290–310
- 'Dangerous Merchandise: Smuggling, Jacobitism, and Commercial Culture in Southeast England, 1690-1760', in Journal of British Studies, XXX (1991), pp. 150–182
