= John Lindsay (Royal Navy officer) =

Royal Navy officer and politician (1737–1788)

Rear-Admiral Sir John Lindsay KB
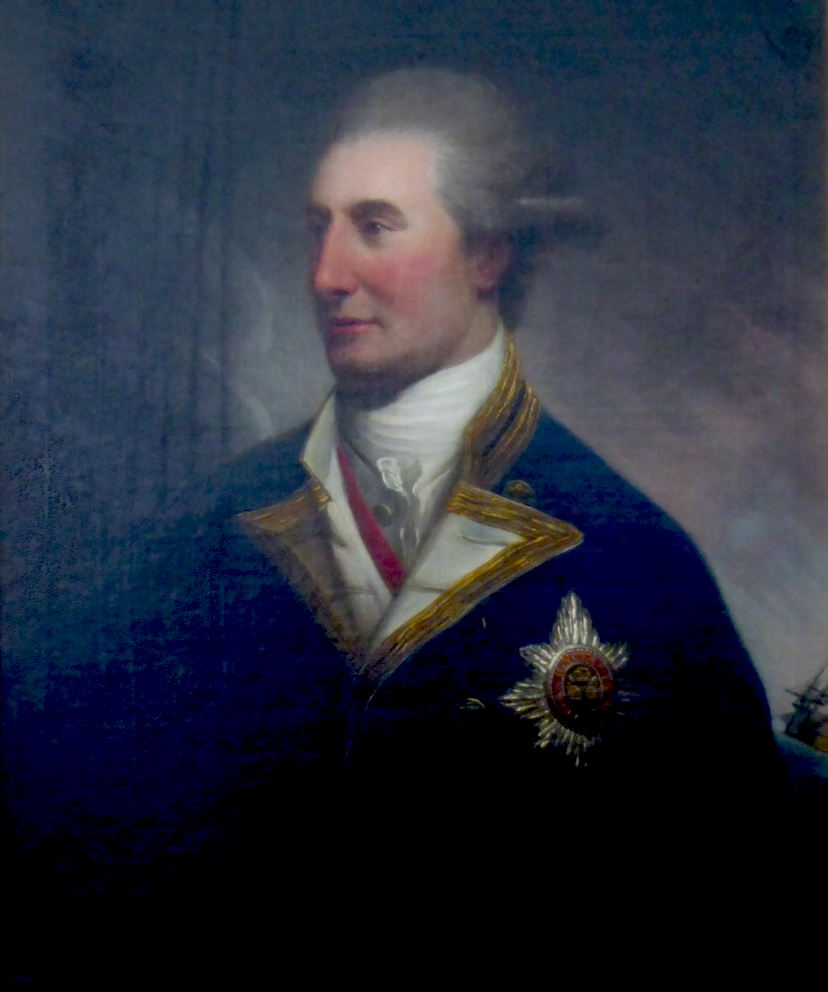
- Portrait by David Martin
- Born: 1737
- Died: 4 June 1788 (aged 50–51)
- Spouse: Mary Milner
- Children: 5
- Relatives: Sir Alexander Lindsay (father); Sir David Lindsay (brother); Margaret Lindsay Ramsay (sister), William Murray, 1st Earl of Mansfield (uncle)
- Military career
- Allegiance: Great Britain
- Branch: Royal Navy
- Service years: 1749–1788
- Rank: Rear-Admiral of the Red
- Commands: HMS Pluto; HMS Trent; HMS Cambridge; HMS Tartar; East Indies Station; HMS Stag; HMS Victory; HMS Prince George; Lord Commissioner of the Admiralty; Mediterranean Fleet; HMS Trusty
- Conflicts: Seven Years' War; Siege of Louisbourg (1758); American Revolutionary War; Battle of Ushant (1778)

Rear-Admiral of the Red Sir John Lindsay KB (1737 – 4 June 1788) was a Royal Navy officer and politician. Joining the Navy during the Seven Years' War, he served off France, followed by service for several years as captain of a warship stationed in the West Indies. After war's end, he returned to Britain, serving as an MP for Aberdeen Burghs from 1767 to 1768.

From August 1769 to March 1772 Lindsay was promoted to commodore and assigned as commander-in-chief of the East Indies Station. He resigned from the Navy for a period following the Battle of Ushant off the coast of France, during the American War of Independence. In 1784 he was assigned as commodore and commander-in-chief in the Mediterranean. In the last year of his life, he was promoted to flag rank as an honorary measure, as his poor health prevented him from seeing active service.

He and his wife had no children together, but he was known to have three illegitimate children, including two daughters and a son, each by different women. One was Dido Elizabeth Belle, a mixed-race daughter born into slavery in 1761 in the West Indies. He entrusted the girl to his maternal uncle William Murray, 1st Earl of Mansfield to raise free in England. Murray served as Lord Chief Justice, ruling on cases important to the abolition of slavery. Belle was educated by and inherited money from Murray.

== Early life ==
John Lindsay was born in 1737 to Sir Alexander Lindsay, 3rd Baronet of Evelix (near Dornoch in Easter Ross) and Amelia Murray, daughter of David Murray, 5th Viscount of Stormont. His mother was sister to William Murray, 1st Earl of Mansfield. His sister Margaret Lindsay was tutored in painting by Allan Ramsay. In 1752 she eloped and married him as his second wife. Her parents became alienated from her by the marriage, which they disapproved. Her brother John remained loyal to her until her death in 1782.

== Naval career ==
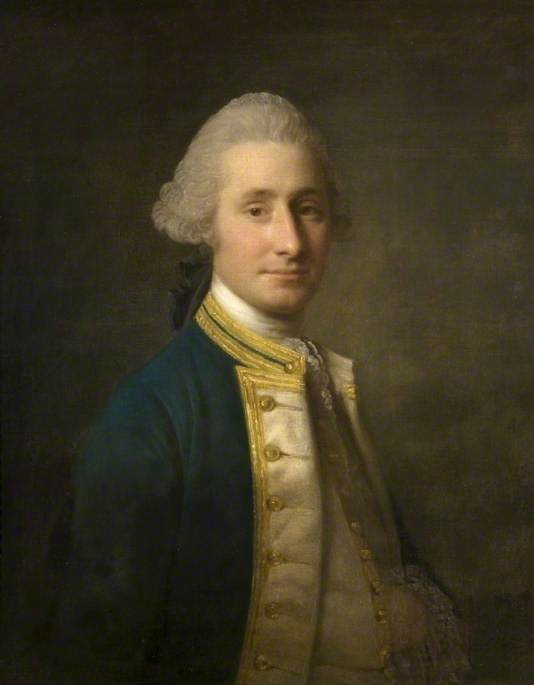
c. 1768–1769 portrait of Lindsay by Allan Ramsay

Lindsay joined the Royal Navy during the Seven Years' War. He was made a lieutenant in 1756 commanding the fireship Pluto. He participated in Sir Edward Hawke's 1757 expedition to attack Rochefort. On 29 September 1757, Lindsay was made captain of the 28-gun frigate HMS Trent, serving from 1757 to 1763. He served in both the West Indies and in home waters during the war. Trent was among ships used to try to capture Spanish ships in the Caribbean.

Trent was part of Sir George Pocock's fleet at the taking of Havana from the Spanish in 1762. During that action, Lindsay took over command of the 80-gun HMS Cambridge on 1 July when her commander William Goostrey was killed by rifle fire from the Morro Castle, which he was trying to capture. For this and "many strong proofs of his valour" shown in the battle, he was rewarded with a permanent command of HMS Cambridge, the 70-gun HMS Marlborough or the 74-gun HMS Dragon (it is unknown which he chose, and he was still on the Trent in December 1763). After his return to England following the conclusion of the war, Lindsay received a knighthood on 10 February 1764.

Lindsay returned to the West Indies, in command of the Tartar. His ship carried one of John Harrison's chronometers for tests and Thomas Erskine was serving as one of his midshipmen. He returned to Britain in 1765, following the conclusion of the war. Lindsay was MP for Aberdeen Burghs from 1767 to 1768.

== Personal life and marriage ==
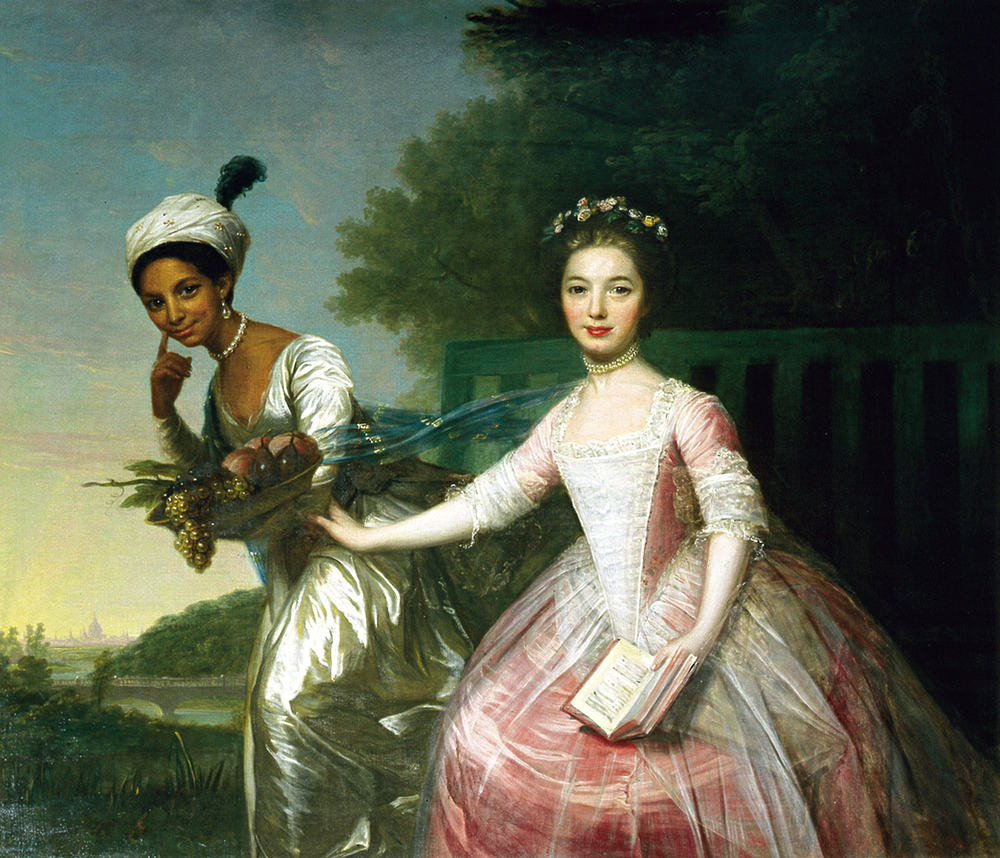
Dido Elizabeth Belle and Lady Elizabeth Murray (David Martin, 1778)

While in the West Indies, Lindsay had a child with a Black woman named Maria Bell, who gave birth to a daughter in 1761 when she was about 15. Lindsay then returned to England in 1765 presumably with Maria and their daughter. Later accounts claimed that Maria met Lindsay when he captured a Spanish ship that she was on board.

In England, the daughter was baptized as Dido Elizabeth Belle by Maria in November 1766 at St George’s Church Bloomsbury, Lindsay was absent from the baptism and record, Dido wasn't publicly acknowledged by her father hence she was given her mother's last name instead. Lindsay wasn't in England around this time, as he appeared in Jamaican baptism record of his other daughter named Elizabeth Lindsay in December 1766.

Under colonial law, Dido Belle was born into slavery and after her baptism, she was taken to Kenwood House to be raised by Lindsay's uncle William Murray, 1st Earl of Mansfield, who educated and cared for her alongside her cousin, Lady Elizabeth Murray. Dido lived with them for 30 years and married after her uncle's death. Murray's will officially confirmed her freedom alongside a sum and an annuity in 1793.

Lindsay had at least five illegitimate children by five different women from 1761–1767 in Jamaica:

1. Dido Elizabeth Belle (June 1761 – 1804), by Maria Belle "negro slave"
2. John Edward Lindsay (Feb 1762–1762), by Mary Vellet "mulatto"
3. Ann Lindsay (November 1766), by Sarah Gandwell "free negro"
4. Elizabeth Lindsay "Palmer" (Dec 1766–1842) by Martha G
5. John Lindsay (Nov 1767–1821), by Francis Edwards "free mulatto"

On 19 September 1768, Lindsay married Mary Milner (1740-1799), daughter of Sir William Milner. They had no children.

Despite being married, Lindsay still kept Maria Belle in England with him until 1774, when Lindsay having made her free and paid for her manumission, also transferred a piece of property in Pensacola to Maria, where she was to live and required her to build a house within 10 years, "the manumission transaction for the sum of two hundred Spanish milled dollars paid by Maria Belle a Negro Woman Slave about 28 years of age" dated 22 August 1774.

His younger children, John and Elizabeth Lindsay weren't brought to Kenwood House, but both ended up being raised in Edinburgh, Scotland. They were known to correspond with each other, later his son John became a colonel and when he died, he left his estate to his mother Francis and his sister Elizabeth. When Elizabeth married to a merchant Peter Hill, she continued to reference her father as Sir John Lindsay (Dido made no such reference). It was said that Elizabeth didn't approve on social ground of her husband's friendship with poet Robert Burns.

By the end of his life, Lindsay was known to reside in Scotland, he only acknowledged two children in his will, leaving £1,000 to "John and Elizabeth, my reputed son and daughter."

=== Slavery ===
In December 1765, Lindsay was due to purchase 12 slaves from the merchants Henry Driscoll and Henry Lizars when the ship transporting them, Cumberland, sank on 17 December while sailing from Jamaica to the Gulf of Honduras. It is unknown whether these slaves were intended to be owned by Lindsay personally or if he was acting as an agent for someone else. In 1774 Lindsay was part of a group of individuals who jointly purchased £15,000 worth of annuities from a John Mills. The annuities were secured on the latter's estates on Nevis, which included Mills' slaves.

=== East Indies ===
From August 1769 to March 1772 Lindsay was promoted to commodore and assigned as commander-in-chief of the East Indies Station, flying his broad pennant flown from the frigate Stag. While in India, he was awarded the Order of the Bath (28 June 1770), though he was still a relatively junior sea officer. He was ordered to investigate dealings between the British East India Company and the Indian nawabs. This made him unpopular with the company and he was soon recalled.

=== Ushant ===
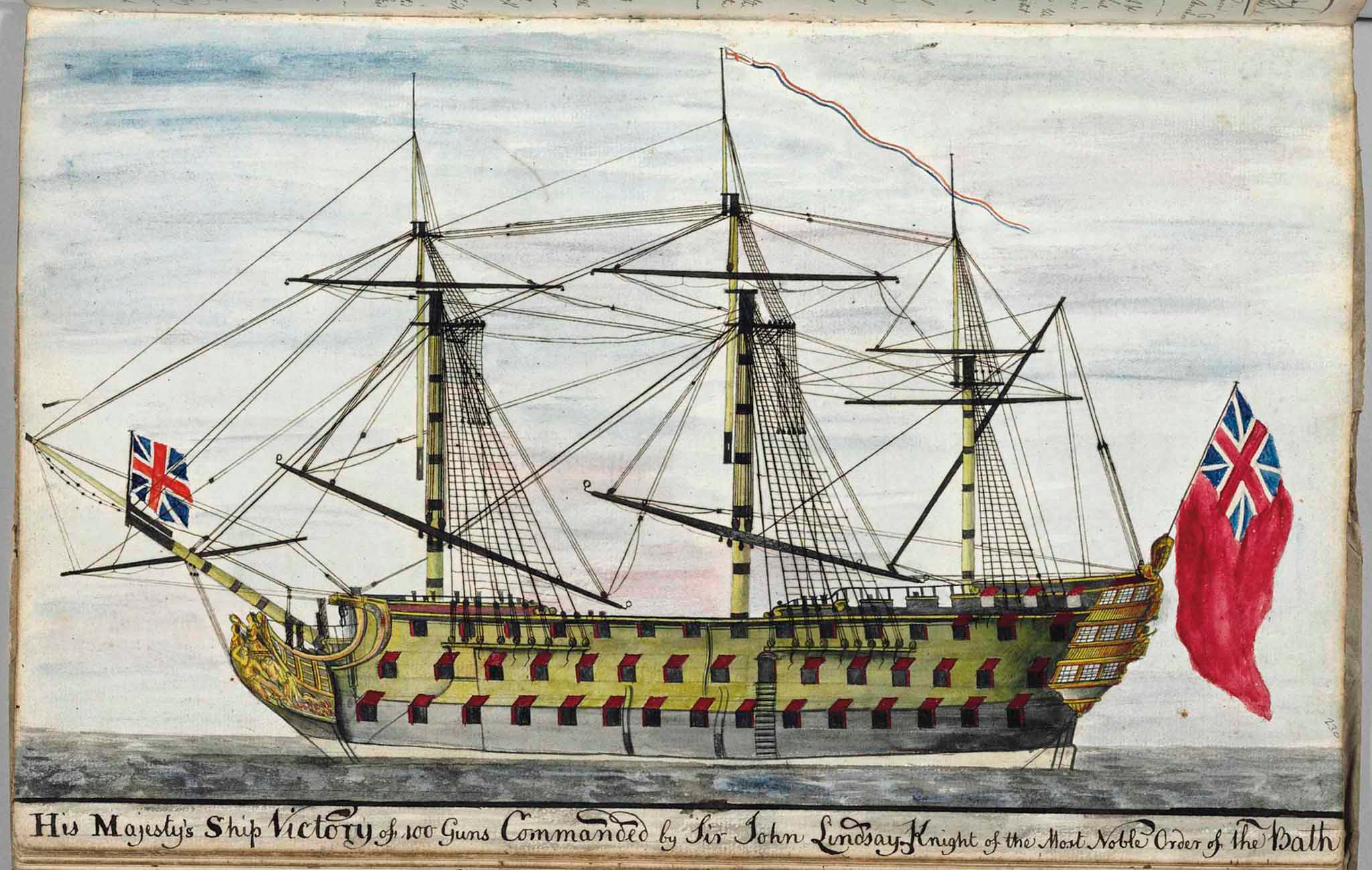
1778 illustration of HMS Victory under Lindsay's command

From March to May 1778, he was the first captain of the first-rate HMS Victory. He was assigned as captain of the 90-gun HMS Prince George when Admiral Keppel decided to raise his flag in Victory (with John Campbell as his flag captain) after the ship's commissioning in May 1778. Lindsay commanded the Prince George in the disastrous Battle of Ushant on 27 July 1778. After giving evidence against Sir Hugh Palliser to the ensuing courts martial, he resigned straight after Keppel. He refused to accept any command during Lord Sandwich's administration of the Admiralty, thus missing the American War of Independence.

=== Later life and death ===
His successors appreciated Lindsay's ability, and he was appointed as Admiralty Commissioner between April and December 1783. He next was assigned as commodore and commander-in-chief in the Mediterranean, with HMS Trusty as his flagship. At Naples 24 June 1784, he entertained the king and queen of Sicily on board his ship.

Soon afterward, his health began to fail and he had to return to England. He was promoted to Rear-Admiral of the Red on 24 September 1787. For health reasons he held it as an honorary role rather than an active one. He died at Marlborough, on his way from a health trip to Bath, on 4 June 1788, aged fifty-one. He is buried in Westminster Abbey.

== Mansfield family tree ==
Mansfield and Finch family tree including peerages of Winchilsea and Nottingham

Lord Scone, 1605; Viscount Stormont, 1621	Viscount Maidstone, 1623; Earl of Winchilsea, 1628
David Murray d. 1631; 1st Viscount of Stormont, etc.	Mungo Murray; 1580–1641/1642; 2nd Viscount of Stormont, etc.	Moyle Finch c. 1550–1614; 1st Baronet of Eastwell	Elizabeth Finch; 1556–1634; 1st Countess of Winchilsea and Viscountess Maidstone
David Murray of Balgonie, Fifeshire d. 1628	Thomas Finch; 1578–1639; 2nd Earl of Winchilsea, etc.	Heneage Finch; 1580–1631
Lord Balvaird, 1641
Andrew Murray c. 1597–1644; 1st Lord Balvaird	James Johnstone Murray d. 1658; 2nd Earl of Annandale, etc. 3rd Viscount of Stormont, etc.
Baron FitzHerbert of Eastwell in the County of Kent, 1660	Baron Finch of Daventry, 1673; Earl of Nottingham (7th creation), 1681
David Murray c. 1636–1668; 4th Viscount Stormont, etc., 2nd Lord Balvaird	Heneage Finch c. 1628–1689; 3rd Earl of Winchilsea, etc., 1st Baron FitzHerbert	Heneage Finch; 1620–1682; 1st Earl of Nottingham, etc.
David Murray; 1665–1731; 5th Viscount of Stormont, etc., 3rd Lord Balvaird	Marjory Scott d. 1746	William Finch c. 1651–1672 styled Viscount Maidstone	Heneage Finch; 1657–1726; 5th Earl of Winchilsea, etc., 3rd Baron FitzHerbert	John Finch; 1682/83–1729; 6th Earl of Winchilsea, etc., 4th Baron FitzHerbert	Daniel Finch; 1647–1730; 7th Earl of Winchilsea, etc., 2nd Earl of Nottingham, etc.	Anne Hatton
Barony FitzHerbert extinct, 1729
Baron Mansfield, 1756; Earl of Mansfield, in the County of Nottingham, 1776; Earl of Mansfield, in the County of Middlesex, 1792
David Murray c. 1689–1748; 6th Viscount of Stormont, etc., 4th Lord Balvaird	James Murray c. 1690–1770	Charles Finch; 1672–1712; 4th Earl of Winchilsea, etc.	Marjory Murray d. c. 1765	John Hay of Cromlix; 1691–1740	Daniel Finch; 1689–1769; 8th Earl of Winchilsea, etc. 3rd Earl of Nottingham, etc.	Edward Finch; 1697–1771	Elizabeth Finch; 1704–1784	William Murray; 1705–1793; 1st Earl of Mansfield (in Nottingham and Middlesex)	Amelia Murray d. 1774	Alexander Lindsay; 1683–1762; 3rd Baronet of Evelick
Barony Mansfield extinct, 1793
Louisa Cathcart; 1758–1843; 2nd Countess of Mansfield (in Nottingham)	David Murray; 1727–1796; 2nd Earl of Mansfield (in Middlesex), 7th Viscount of Stormont, etc., 5th Lord Balvaird	Henrietta Frederica Bünau; 1737–1766	George Finch; 1752–1826; 9th Earl of Winchilsea, etc., 4th Earl of Nottingham, etc.	George Finch-Hatton; 1747–1823	David Lindsay c. 1732–1797; 4th Baronet	John Lindsay; 1737–1788	Margaret Lindsay Ramsay c. 1726–1782
Frederica Markham; 1774–1860	David William Murray; 1777–1840; 3rd Earl of Mansfield (in Middlesex), 8th Viscount of Stormont, etc., 6th Lord Balvaird	Henry Murray; 1784–1860	Elizabeth Murray; 1760–1825	William Lindsay d. 1796	Dido Elizabeth Belle; 1761–1804
Frederica Murray; 1800–1823	James Hamilton Stanhope; 1788–1825	William David Murray; 1806–1898; 4th (in Middlesex, 3rd in Nottingham) Earl of Mansfield, 9th Viscount of Stormont, etc., 7th Lord Balvaird	George William Finch-Hatton; 1791–1858; 10th Earl of Winchilsea, etc., 5th Earl of Nottingham, etc.
James Stanhope; 1821–1904	William Stanhope styled Viscount Stormont	George James Finch-Hatton; 1815–1887; 11th Earl of Winchilsea, etc., 6th Earl of Nottingham, etc.	Murray Edward Gordon Finch-Hatton; 1851–1898; 12th Earl of Winchilsea, etc., 7th Earl of Nottingham, etc.	Henry Stormont Finch-Hatton; 1852–1927; 13th Earl of Winchilsea, etc., 8th Earl of Nottingham, etc.
William Murray; 1860–1906; 5th (in Middlesex, 4th in Nottingham) Earl of Mansfield, 10th Viscount of Stormont, etc., 8th Lord Balvaird	Alan Murray; 1864–1935; 6th (in Middlesex, 5th in Nottingham) Earl of Mansfield, 11th Viscount of Stormont, etc., 9th Lord Balvaird	Guy Montagu George Finch-Hatton; 1885–1939; 14th Earl of Winchilsea, etc., 9th Earl of Nottingham, etc.
Mungo David Malcolm Murray; 1900–1971; 7th (in Middlesex, 6th in Nottingham) Earl of Mansfield, 12th Viscount of Stormont, etc., 10th Lord Balvaird	Christopher Guy Heneage Finch-Hatton; 1911–1950; 15th Earl of Winchilsea, etc., 10th Earl of Nottingham, etc.
William David Mungo James Murray; 1930–2015; 8th (in Middlesex, 7th in Nottingham) Earl of Mansfield, 13th Viscount of Stormont, etc., 11th Lord Balvaird	Christopher Denys Stormonte Finch-Hatton; 1936–1999; 16th Earl of Winchilsea, etc., 11th Earl of Nottingham, etc.
Alexander David Mungo Murray b. 1956; 9th (in Middlesex, 8th in Nottingham) Earl of Mansfield, 14th Viscount of Stormont, etc., 12th Lord Balvaird	Daniel James Hatfield Finch-Hatton b. 1967; 17th Earl of Winchilsea, etc., 12th Earl of Nottingham, etc.

== See also ==
- Shadow family

== Sources ==
- R. Beatson, Naval and military memoirs of Great Britain, 3 vols. (1790)
- J. Charnock, ed., Biographia navalis, 6 (1798)
- E. Haden-Guest, "Lindsay, John", Houses of Parliament records, Commons, 1754–90, 3.44
- DNB
- British Library, material on his appointment and some of his correspondence with the East India Company, Add. MS 18020

Parliament of Great Britain
Preceded by David Scott	Member of Parliament for Aberdeen Burghs; 1767–1768	Succeeded by Thomas Lyon
Military offices
Vacant	Commander-in-Chief, Mediterranean Fleet; 1783–1784	Succeeded by Phillips Cosby
