= Viscount of Stormont =

Title in the Peerage of Scotland

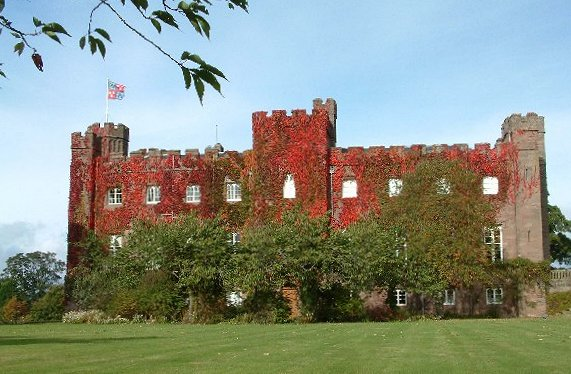
Scone Palace: the seat of the Murray family

Viscount of Stormont is a title in the Peerage of Scotland. It was created in 1621 by James VI for his friend and helper Sir David Murray who had saved him from the attack of the Earl of Gowrie in 1600. Murray had already been created Lord Scone, also in the Peerage of Scotland in 1605. The peerages were created with remainder to 1) Sir Mungo Murray, fourth son of John Murray, 1st Earl of Tullibardine, failing which to 2) John Murray, who was created Earl of Annandale in 1625, and failing which to 3) Sir Andrew Murray, who was created Lord Balvaird in 1641. Lord Stormont died childless and was succeeded according to the special remainder by the aforementioned Mungo Murray, the second Viscount. He died without male issue and was succeeded according to the special remainder by James Murray, 2nd Earl of Annandale, who now also became the third Viscount Stormont. He was the son of the aforementioned John Murray, 1st Earl of Annandale. He was also childless and on his death in 1658 the earldom became extinct.

He was succeeded in the lordship of Scone and the viscountcy of Stormont according to the special remainder by David Murray, 2nd Lord Balvaird, who became the fourth Viscount Stormont (see the Lord Balvaird for earlier history of this title). He was the son of the aforementioned Andrew Murray, 1st Lord Balvaird. On his death the titles passed to his son, the fifth Viscount. His second son, James Murray was Member of Parliament for Dumfriesshire from 1711 to 1713, and later supported the Jacobite rising of 1715. In 1721 he was created Earl of Dunbar, Viscount of Drumcairn and Lord Halldykes in the Jacobite peerage. His third son was the prominent lawyer and judge William Murray, 1st Earl of Mansfield and Mansfield. In 1793 Lord Stormont's grandson, the seventh Viscount, succeeded his uncle as second Earl of Mansfield according to a special remainder in the letters patent. For further history of the titles, see the Earl of Mansfield.

== Viscounts of Stormont (1621) ==
- David Murray, 1st Viscount of Stormont (d. 1631)
- Mungo Murray, 2nd Viscount of Stormont (d. 1642)
- James Murray, 2nd Earl of Annandale, 3rd Viscount of Stormont (d. 1658)
- David Murray, 4th Viscount of Stormont (c. 1636–1668)
- David Murray, 5th Viscount of Stormont (c. 1665–1731)
- David Murray, 6th Viscount of Stormont (c. 1689–1748)
- David Murray, 7th Viscount of Stormont (1727–1796) (succeeded as Earl of Mansfield in 1793)

For further succession see the Earl of Mansfield and Mansfield

== Family tree ==
Mansfield and Finch family tree including peerages of Winchilsea and Nottingham

Lord Scone, 1605; Viscount Stormont, 1621	Viscount Maidstone, 1623; Earl of Winchilsea, 1628
David Murray d. 1631; 1st Viscount of Stormont, etc.	Mungo Murray; 1580–1641/1642; 2nd Viscount of Stormont, etc.	Moyle Finch c. 1550–1614; 1st Baronet of Eastwell	Elizabeth Finch; 1556–1634; 1st Countess of Winchilsea and Viscountess Maidstone
David Murray of Balgonie, Fifeshire d. 1628	Thomas Finch; 1578–1639; 2nd Earl of Winchilsea, etc.	Heneage Finch; 1580–1631
Lord Balvaird, 1641
Andrew Murray c. 1597–1644; 1st Lord Balvaird	James Johnstone Murray d. 1658; 2nd Earl of Annandale, etc. 3rd Viscount of Stormont, etc.
Baron FitzHerbert of Eastwell in the County of Kent, 1660	Baron Finch of Daventry, 1673; Earl of Nottingham (7th creation), 1681
David Murray c. 1636–1668; 4th Viscount Stormont, etc., 2nd Lord Balvaird	Heneage Finch c. 1628–1689; 3rd Earl of Winchilsea, etc., 1st Baron FitzHerbert	Heneage Finch; 1620–1682; 1st Earl of Nottingham, etc.
David Murray; 1665–1731; 5th Viscount of Stormont, etc., 3rd Lord Balvaird	Marjory Scott d. 1746	William Finch c. 1651–1672 styled Viscount Maidstone	Heneage Finch; 1657–1726; 5th Earl of Winchilsea, etc., 3rd Baron FitzHerbert	John Finch; 1682/83–1729; 6th Earl of Winchilsea, etc., 4th Baron FitzHerbert	Daniel Finch; 1647–1730; 7th Earl of Winchilsea, etc., 2nd Earl of Nottingham, etc.	Anne Hatton
Barony FitzHerbert extinct, 1729
Baron Mansfield, 1756; Earl of Mansfield, in the County of Nottingham, 1776; Earl of Mansfield, in the County of Middlesex, 1792
David Murray c. 1689–1748; 6th Viscount of Stormont, etc., 4th Lord Balvaird	James Murray c. 1690–1770	Charles Finch; 1672–1712; 4th Earl of Winchilsea, etc.	Marjory Murray d. c. 1765	John Hay of Cromlix; 1691–1740	Daniel Finch; 1689–1769; 8th Earl of Winchilsea, etc. 3rd Earl of Nottingham, etc.	Edward Finch; 1697–1771	Elizabeth Finch; 1704–1784	William Murray; 1705–1793; 1st Earl of Mansfield (in Nottingham and Middlesex)	Amelia Murray d. 1774	Alexander Lindsay; 1683–1762; 3rd Baronet of Evelick
Barony Mansfield extinct, 1793
Louisa Cathcart; 1758–1843; 2nd Countess of Mansfield (in Nottingham)	David Murray; 1727–1796; 2nd Earl of Mansfield (in Middlesex), 7th Viscount of Stormont, etc., 5th Lord Balvaird	Henrietta Frederica Bünau; 1737–1766	George Finch; 1752–1826; 9th Earl of Winchilsea, etc., 4th Earl of Nottingham, etc.	George Finch-Hatton; 1747–1823	David Lindsay c. 1732–1797; 4th Baronet	John Lindsay; 1737–1788	Margaret Lindsay Ramsay c. 1726–1782
Frederica Markham; 1774–1860	David William Murray; 1777–1840; 3rd Earl of Mansfield (in Middlesex), 8th Viscount of Stormont, etc., 6th Lord Balvaird	Henry Murray; 1784–1860	Elizabeth Murray; 1760–1825	William Lindsay d. 1796	Dido Elizabeth Belle; 1761–1804
Frederica Murray; 1800–1823	James Hamilton Stanhope; 1788–1825	William David Murray; 1806–1898; 4th (in Middlesex, 3rd in Nottingham) Earl of Mansfield, 9th Viscount of Stormont, etc., 7th Lord Balvaird	George William Finch-Hatton; 1791–1858; 10th Earl of Winchilsea, etc., 5th Earl of Nottingham, etc.
James Stanhope; 1821–1904	William Stanhope styled Viscount Stormont	George James Finch-Hatton; 1815–1887; 11th Earl of Winchilsea, etc., 6th Earl of Nottingham, etc.	Murray Edward Gordon Finch-Hatton; 1851–1898; 12th Earl of Winchilsea, etc., 7th Earl of Nottingham, etc.	Henry Stormont Finch-Hatton; 1852–1897; 13th Earl of Winchilsea, etc., 8th Earl of Nottingham, etc.
William Murray; 1860–1906; 5th (in Middlesex, 4th in Nottingham) Earl of Mansfield, 10th Viscount of Stormont, etc., 8th Lord Balvaird	Alan Murray; 1864–1935; 6th (in Middlesex, 5th in Nottingham) Earl of Mansfield, 11th Viscount of Stormont, etc., 9th Lord Balvaird	Guy Montagu George Finch-Hatton; 1885–1939; 14th Earl of Winchilsea, etc., 9th Earl of Nottingham, etc.
Mungo David Malcolm Murray; 1900–1971; 7th (in Middlesex, 6th in Nottingham) Earl of Mansfield, 12th Viscount of Stormont, etc., 10th Lord Balvaird	Christopher Guy Heneage Finch-Hatton; 1911–1950; 15th Earl of Winchilsea, etc., 10th Earl of Nottingham, etc.
William David Mungo James Murray; 1930–2015; 8th (in Middlesex, 7th in Nottingham) Earl of Mansfield, 13th Viscount of Stormont, etc., 11th Lord Balvaird	Christopher Denys Stormonte Finch-Hatton; 1936–1999; 16th Earl of Winchilsea, etc., 11th Earl of Nottingham, etc.
Alexander David Mungo Murray b. 1956; 9th (in Middlesex, 8th in Nottingham) Earl of Mansfield, 14th Viscount of Stormont, etc., 12th Lord Balvaird	Daniel James Hatfield Finch-Hatton b. 1967; 17th Earl of Winchilsea, etc., 12th Earl of Nottingham, etc.

== See also ==
- Stormont Loch
