= Lord of Balvaird =

Title of Scottish baronial nobility

Lordship of Balvaird
- Creation: Baronage of Scotland
- Created by: James VI and I
- First holder: Andrew Murray, Baron of Balvaird
- Present holder: Brady Brim-DeForest of Balvaird Castle, Baron of Balvaird
- Heir apparent: Huxley Byron Brim-DeForest, Younger of Balvaird
- Remainder to: heirs and assignees
- Subsidiary titles: Baron of Balvaird; Lord of Balvaird
- Status: extant
- Seat: Balvaird Castle
- Motto: Un Cran Plus Loin (“One Step Further")

Lord of Balvaird or Baron of Balvaird (Note: for Lords in the Baronage of Scotland a lord is a baron and a baron is a lord and is interchangeable, the chapeau represents Scottish barons in historic heraldry instead of a coronet) is a title of nobility in the Baronage of Scotland. It was originally confirmed by James VI in 1624 for Andrew Murray as a barony and later erected into a lordship in favour of David Murray, 5th Viscount of Stormont in 1673.

== History ==
The caput is Balvaird Castle, located in the county of Perthshire in Scotland. One of the borders of the barony was at one time the River Farg. The barony was originally granted by a charter of confirmation in favour of Andrew Murray "of the lands and barony of Balvaird" dated 16 March 1624. In the charter, the barony is described in Latin in the crown grant as "terrarum et baronie de Balvaird". The spelling of the name of the title has many variations, including Balverd, Balverde, Balward, Balwaird, and Baleward.

In 1673, a charter of erection raised the barony into the lordship of Balvaird, granted in favour of David Murray, 5th Viscount of Stormont. The subjects of the charter are narrated in English as "all and whole various lands incorporated into the Lordship and Barony of Balvaird, together with the tower, fortalice and manor place of Balvaird”.

The Barony of Balvaird is one of several Scottish baronies. The previous Lord of Balvaird, Alexander Murray, 9th Earl of Mansfield, who had inherited the title from his father William Murray, 8th Earl of Mansfield (died in 2015) transferred the title by deed of assignation to Brady Brim-DeForest of Balvaird Castle, current Baron of Balvaird in 2017. He owns both the castle of Balvaird and separately the titular barony of Balvaird.

== Barons of Balvaird (1623) ==
- Andrew Murray, Baron of Balvaird

== Lords of Balvaird (1673) ==
- David Murray, 5th Viscount of Stormont, Lord of Balvaird (1665–1731)
- William Murray, 8th Earl of Mansfield, Lord of Balvaird (1930–2015)
- Alexander Murray, 9th Earl of Mansfield, Lord of Balvaird (2015–2017)
- Brady Brim-DeForest of Balvaird Castle, Lord of Balvaird (2017–present)

== Armorial ==
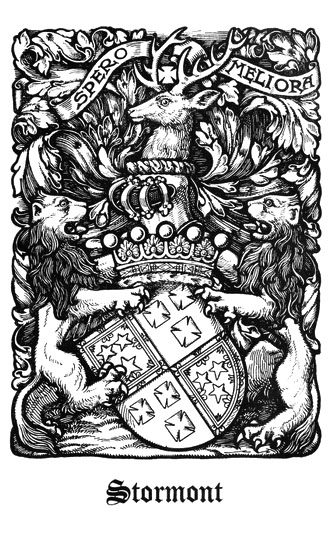
The Viscount of Stormont, lords from 1658

The Earls of Mansfield, lords until 2017.

Brady Brim-DeForest, Baron and Lord of Balvaird, since 2017.

== See also ==
- Lord Balvaird
