= Ronald Lindsay (disambiguation) =

Ronald Lindsay was a British diplomat.

Ronald Lindsay may also refer to:

- Ronald A. Lindsay, past president and CEO of the Center for Inquiry
- Sir Ronald Alexander Lindsay, 2nd Baronet (1933–2004), of the Lindsay baronets of Dowhill (1962)
