= Balvaird Castle =

Castle in Perth and Kinross, Scotland

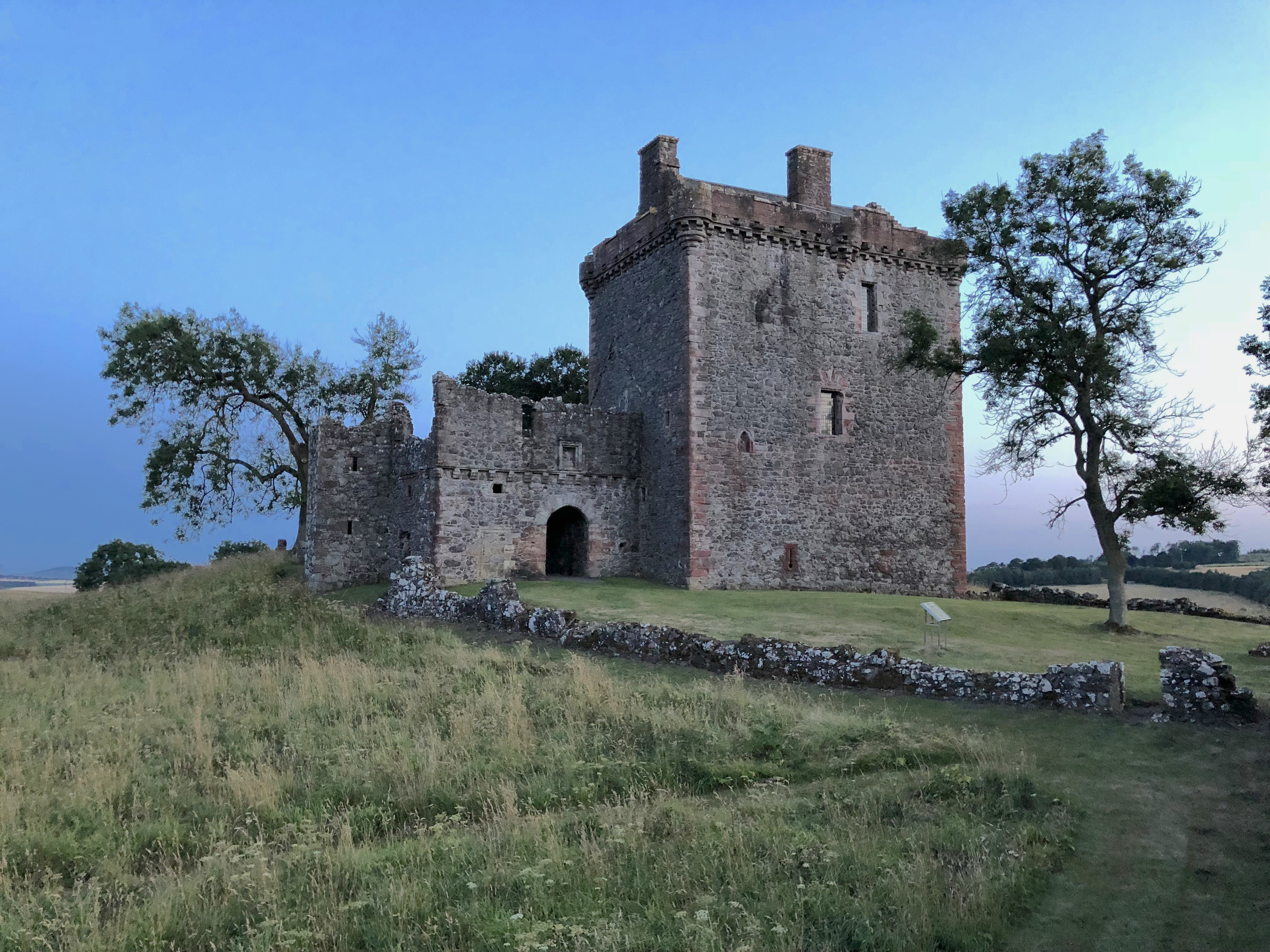
- Balvaird Castle, Perth & Kinross, Scotland

General information
- Location: Perth & Kinross
- Country: Scotland
- Coordinates: 56°17′19.83″N 3°20′33.53″W
- Owner: Brady Brim-DeForest

Scheduled monument
- Designated: 28 February 1950
- Reference no.: SM90027

Balvaird Castle in Perthshire is a traditional late medieval Scottish tower house. It is located in the Ochil Hills, around five kilometres (three miles) south of Abernethy. The name Balvaird is from Baile a' Bhàird, 'Township of the Bard' in Gaelic. Balvaird Castle is a scheduled monument, and is in the care of Historic Environment Scotland. The spelling of its name has many variations, including Balverd, Balverde, Balward, Balwaird and Baleward.

== Origins ==
Balvaird was built around the year 1495 for Sir Andrew Murray, a younger son of the family of Murray of Tullibardine. He acquired the lands of Balvaird through marriage to the heiress Margaret Barclay, a member of a wealthy family and daughter of James Barclay of Kippo. It is likely that Balvaird Castle was built on the site of an earlier Barclay family castle. Substantial remnants of earthwork fortifications around the Castle may survive from earlier defences. Balvaird is first mentioned in the written historical record in 1498 as 'the place of Balward' in the Register of the Great Seal of Scotland.

== Additions and later history ==
Over the years the castle was extended and altered. A gatehouse was built in 1567. An outer courtyard was attached to the main gate which possibly contained stabling as well as adding an extra layer of defence to the castle. Another courtyard to the south was a garden, while a much larger walled area to the north-east was an orchard or 'pleasance.'

The family continued to live at Balvaird until they were elevated to the Viscountcy of Stormont (ancestors of the Earldom of Mansfield) and in 1658 moved to the rather more comfortable Scone Palace, near Perth. Thereafter the castle continued to be inhabited, though not by the family itself. In its later days, it probably accommodated farmworkers.

In 1887, MacGibbon & Ross note the presence of a 'recumbent statue lying in the castle', that could have been that of Lady Margaret Barclay, who married the first Sir Andrew Murray in 1495.

Having been restored and partially excavated in recent years by Historic Scotland, by whom it is maintained, the castle is a particularly fine and complete example of a traditional late medieval Scottish tower house. The site is open at all times, but the castle itself has not been open to the public for several years for safety reasons, due to structural deterioration. Balvaird Castle is the caput of the baronial Lordship of Balvaird. It was owned by the Murray family until 2017 and is currently owned by American entrepreneur, Brady Brim-DeForest.

== Architecture ==
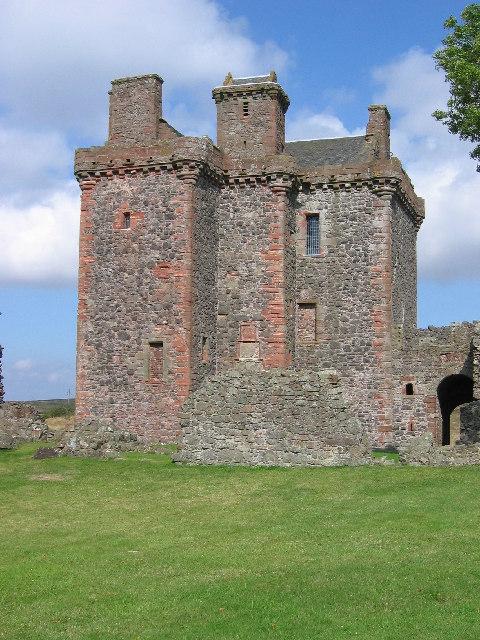
Balvaird Castle from the inner courtyard.

Balvaird is notable among Scottish castles of its date for its refined architectural detail. Features include corbels in the form of carved heads supporting the corner-roundels of the wall-walk, an unusually elaborate aumbry (wall-cupboard) in the first-floor hall and a cap-house above the stair in the form of a miniature tower-house. The ornamentation and dressing throughout are made of red sandstone. It has been suggested that some or all of these carved stone features may have been brought to Balvaird for re-use from an ecclesiastical building. The inclusion of a kitchen on the ground floor is unusual for a building built in this period, and the inverted keyhole gun-holes clearly date the building's construction to the late 1400s.
