= Lindsay baronets of Evelick (1666) =

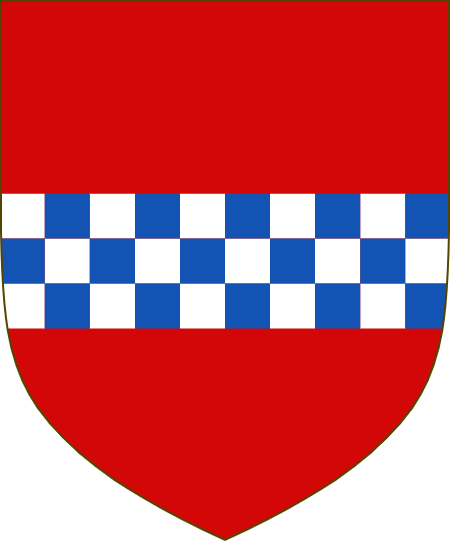
Escutcheon of the Lindsay baronets of Evelick

The Lindsay baronetcy of Evelick (Evelix) in the County of Perth was created in the Baronetage of Nova Scotia on 15 April 1666 for Alexander Lindsay, grandson of Alexander Lindsay, bishop of Dunkeld. The title became extinct on the death of the 5th Baronet in 1799.

== Lindsay baronets, of Evelick (1666) ==
- Sir Alexander Lindsay, 1st Baronet (died c. 1690)
- Sir Alexander Lindsay, 2nd Baronet (1660–c. 1720)
- Sir Alexander Thomas Lindsay, 3rd Baronet (died 1762)
- Sir David Lindsay, 4th Baronet (c. 1732–1797)
- Sir Charles Scott Lindsay, 5th Baronet (died 1799)
