= Duke of Inverness =

Noble title

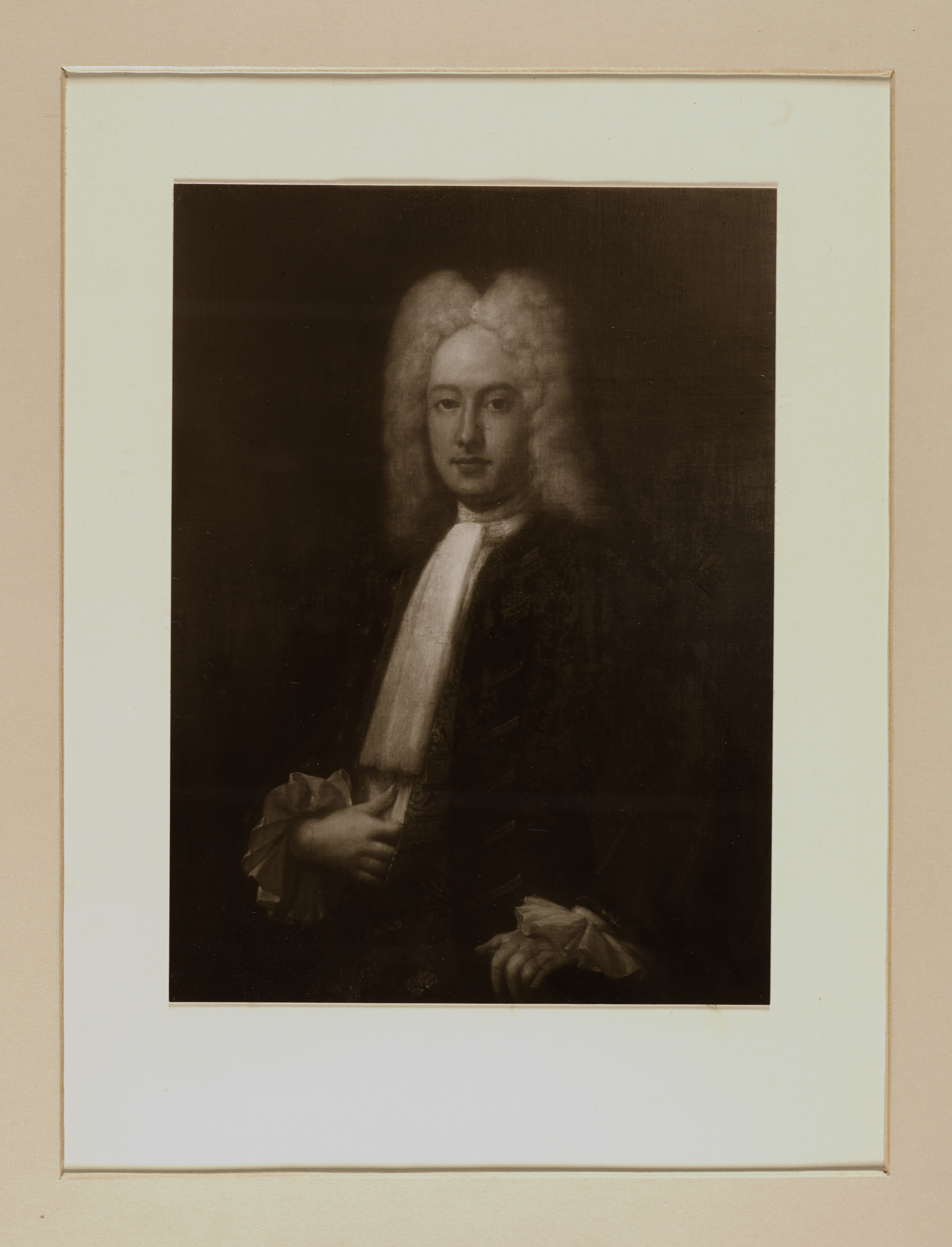
John Hay of Cromlex, Jacobite Duke of Inverness (1727–1740)

The Dukedom of Inverness was first created a title in the Jacobite Peerage of Great Britain, and as such was not recognised by the government or monarch or Great Britain. Its only holder was John Hay of Cromlix.

In 1840 Lady Cecilia Underwood was created the Duchess of Inverness in her own right. She was the second wife of Prince Augustus Frederick, Duke of Sussex, Earl of Inverness, the sixth son of King George III. Their marriage was deemed illegal because of the Royal Marriages Act 1772, so Cecilia was never recognized as Duchess of Sussex or a British princess. Instead, Queen Victoria created Cecilia Duchess of Inverness with remainder to the heirs male of her body lawfully begotten. The title became extinct upon her death in 1873.

== See also ==
- Earl of Inverness
