= Lindsay baronets =

Set index for Lindsay baronets

There have been three baronetcies held by people with the surname Lindsay, one in the Baronetage of Nova Scotia and two in the Baronetage of the United Kingdom. One creation is extant as of 2026.

- Lindsay baronets of Evelick (1666)
- Lindsay baronets of West Ville (1821)
- Lindsay baronets of Dowhill (1962)

== See also ==
- Lindsay-Hogg baronets
