= David Murray, 5th Viscount of Stormont =

Scottish peer

David Murray, 5th Viscount of Stormont (1665 – 19 November 1731) was a Scottish Jacobite peer.

== Biography ==
He was the son of David Murray, 4th Viscount Stormont (died 1668), and Lady Jean Carnegie, daughter of James Carnegie, 2nd Earl of Southesk and Lady Mary Kerr, daughter of Robert Ker, 1st Earl of Roxburghe

In 1689, Stormont was summoned to attend the Committee of Estates in Edinburgh in the wake of the Glorious Revolution. He failed to attend and was declared a rebel by the Privy Council of Scotland. Four years later he was fined for failing to attend the Parliament of Scotland. Despite subsequently taking an oath of allegiance to Queen Anne, he made little secret of his Jacobite politics. He opposed the Acts of Union 1707.

Between 1705 and 1707 he was in regular correspondence and contact with Jacobite agents in Scotland and France. In advance of the planned French invasion of Britain in 1708, Stormont received instructions from James Francis Edward Stuart, but he was taken into custody for three months, on suspicion, by the government in Edinburgh. He was arrested again on suspicion during the Jacobite rising of 1715, having hosted the Pretender at Scone Palace for three weeks during the rising. He was described by Nathaniel Hooke as being "rich, powerful and strongly determined" in the Jacobite interest.

== Marriage and issue ==
On 31 January 1688, he married Marjory Scott (d. 8 April 1746), daughter of David Scott of Scotstarvit (d. 1718). The couple had the following children:

1. David Murray, 6th Viscount of Stormont (c. 1689–1748) had issue including David, 7th Viscount Stormont later 2nd Earl of Mansfield
2. Hon. James Murray (c. 1690–1770), Jacobite Earl of Dunbar
3. Hon. John Murray (died young)
4. William Murray, 1st Earl of Mansfield (1705–1793)
5. Hon. Catherine Murray (d. 25 November 1754), died unmarried
6. Hon. Marjory Murray, married Col. John Hay of Cromlix, son of 7th Earl of Kinnoull
7. Hon. Amelia Murray (d. 8 February 1774), married Sir Alexander Lindsay of Evelick, by whom she was mother to Margaret and John Lindsay.
8. Hon. Charles Murray, died without children
9. Hon. Robert Murray, died without children
10. Hon. Margaret (c. 1702–18 April 1785), died without children
11. Hon. Jean Murray (d. 10 August 1758), unmarried
12. Hon. Nicola Helen Murray (d. 7 November 1777), died without children
13. Hon. Mary Murray, died unmarried

Peerage of Scotland
Preceded by David Murray	Viscount of Stormont; 1668–1731	Succeeded by David Murray
