= James Murray (Jacobite Earl of Dunbar) =

Scottish Jacobite Secretary of State

James Murray Earl of Dunbar
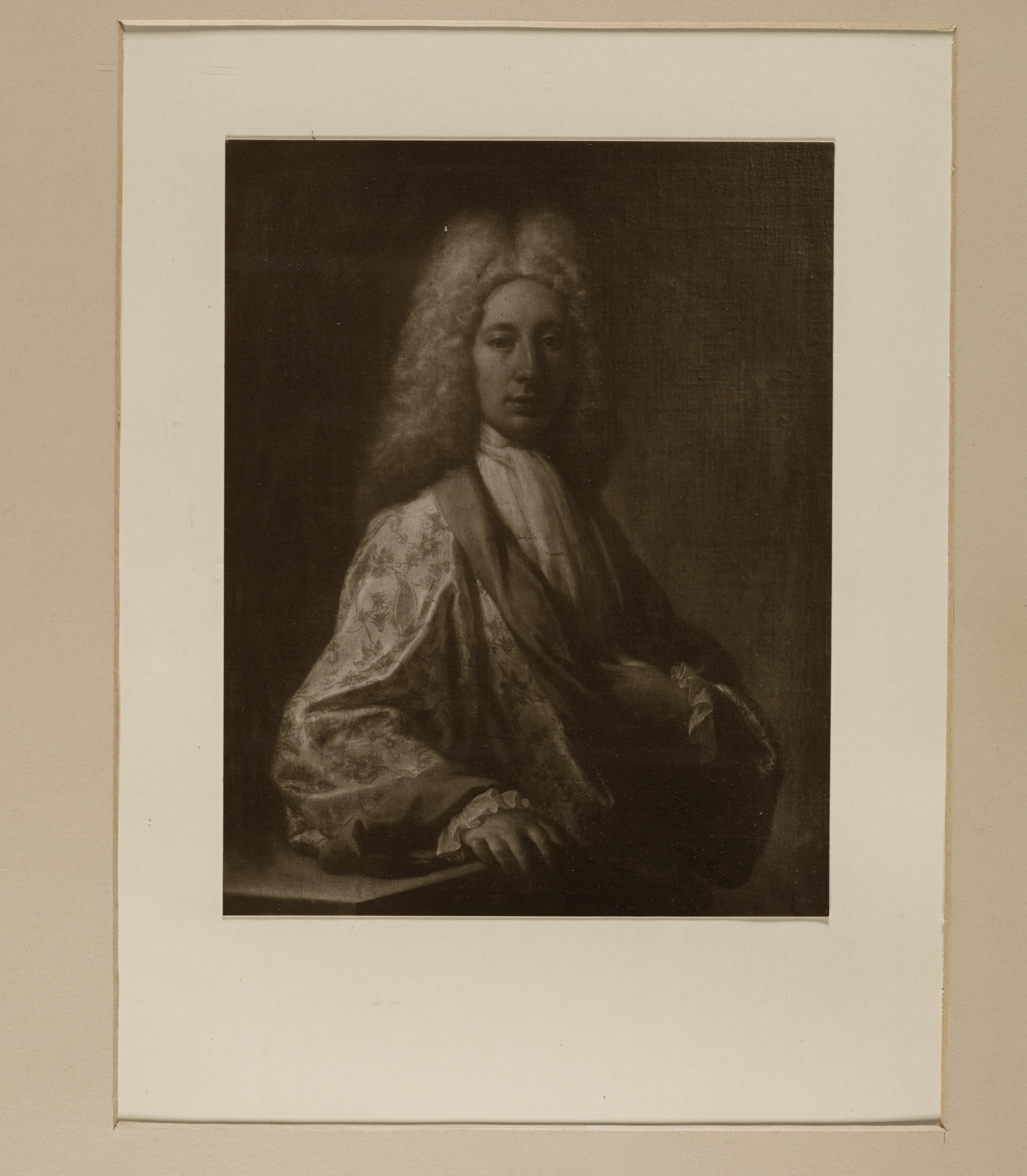
- James Murray, Earl of Dunbar

Jacobite Secretary of State
- In office 1728–1747
- Monarch: James III & VIII
- Preceded by: John Graeme
- Succeeded by: Daniel O'Brien, Earl of Lismore

Personal details
- Born: 1690
- Died: 1770 (aged 79–80) Avignon, Papal States
- Parents: David Murray, 5th Viscount of Stormont (father); Marjory Scott (mother)
- Profession: Politician and courtier

James Murray (c. 1690 – 1770), titular Earl of Dunbar from 1721, was a Scottish Tory politician who became a leading Jacobite agent and courtier. After representing two Scottish constituencies in the House of Commons between 1711 and 1715, he moved to France and became Viscount Bolingbroke's private secretary in the exiled court of James Francis Edward Stuart. He later served as the Jacobite secretary of state in exile in Rome from 1728 to 1747, and as governor and tutor to Charles Edward Stuart.

== Early life and family ==
Murray was the second child of David Murray, 5th Viscount of Stormont and Marjory Scott. His brothers included David Murray, 6th Viscount of Stormont and the First Earl of Mansfield. Despite being Protestants, Murray's family were Jacobites and his father had been declared a rebel by the Privy Council of Scotland in 1689 after he failed to respond to a summons by the Committee of Estates after the Glorious Revolution, and was later imprisoned on several occasions.

== Parliamentary career ==
In 1710, Murray was admitted as an advocate at the Faculty of Advocates, but he apparently never practised. In the 1710 British general election, he was put forward as the candidate for Dumfriesshire by Lord Annandale as a Tory. He was defeated by another Tory, William Grierson, but Murray's popularity among Scottish Tories ensured he was confirmed as a Member of Parliament by petition on 22 February 1711.

Once in parliament, Murray gave his support to the ministry of Robert Harley, 1st Earl of Oxford and Earl Mortimer. He associated himself with a group of MPs concerned with Scottish affairs and which aimed to promote episcopalianism in Scotland. He rapidly acquired a reputation in the Commons as being both ambitious and a holder of grudges. In 1712 he was a leading advocate for the Toleration Act which granted the right to worship for Scottish Episcopalians who prayed for the monarch and used the English Book of Common Prayer. In 1713, he was briefly affiliated with a parliamentary motion to dissolve the union of England and Scotland, but swiftly reverted to supporting the government after the proposal was defeated in the House of Lords.

In November 1713, Murray was appointed as a commissioner to carry out further negotiations for a commercial treaty with France. This brought him into contact with Henry St John, 1st Viscount Bolingbroke, to whom he transferred his political allegiance. The same year he was chosen to represent Elgin Burghs, winning the seat without a contest. In January 1715, Murray failed to persuade the Faculty of Advocates to include in a loyal address sent to George I a clause for the repeal of the Acts of Union 1707. He failed to win a seat in the 1715 British general election, losing the Kinross-shire seat on petition.

== Jacobite agent and courtier ==
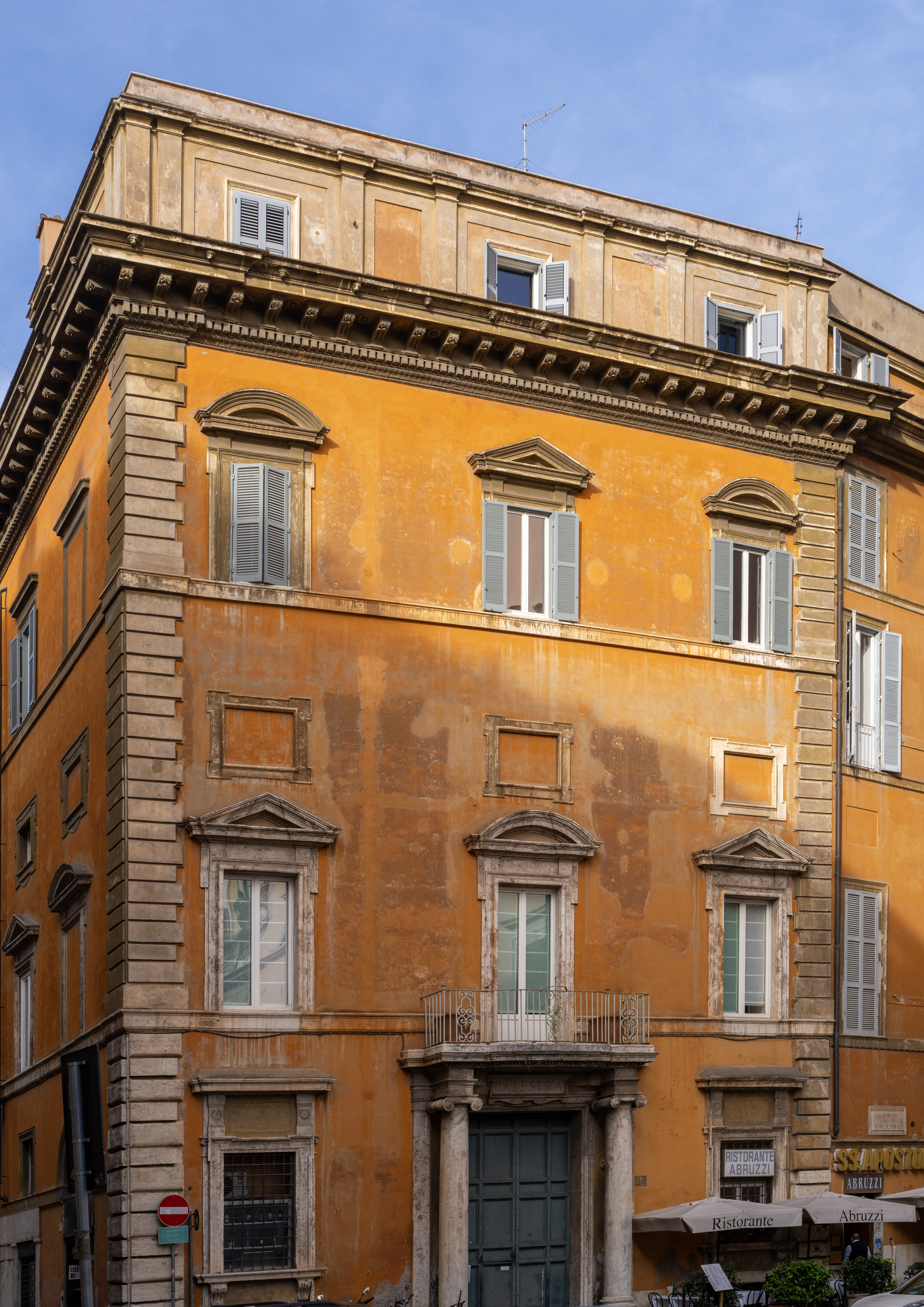
The Palazzo Muti was the centre of the exiled Jacobite court in Rome and Murray's office as Secretary of State to the Old Pretender

After failing to win a seat in the Commons, Murray travelled to the exiled Jacobite court in France, where he joined Viscount Bolingbroke and became his private secretary. In September 1715 during the Jacobite rising of that year, he was dispatched to Scotland with credentials as the Old Pretender's Scottish secretary of state. He returned to France in November with news of the Battle of Sheriffmuir. Subsequently travelling to Scotland a second time, he was captured in Flanders and thereafter imprisoned by the British authorities in Newgate Prison from 16 April to 16 July 1716. After his release he spent the following two years as a Jacobite agent in London and Scotland. In 1718 he returned to the continent and the Jacobite court in Rome.

In 1719 James Murray turned the Jacobite court in Rome into (in Maurice Bruce's words) "a hotbed of intrigue". Upon arriving in Italy, he was immediately tasked with leading negotiations for the marriage of Maria Clementina Sobieska to the Old Pretender, and travelled to Oława in 1719 for this purpose. On 9 May 1719 he received Princess Clementina in Rome in the absence of the Old Pretender, and on the following day he was James Stuart's representative when the couple married by proxy. During the imprisonment of his enemy, the Earl of Mar in Geneva from May 1719 to June 1720, he served as Secretary of State to the Old Pretender. Murray soon assumed considerable power as the Old Pretender's favourite, but gained enemies in the Jacobite court and was sent away from Rome on 6 February 1721 having been created Earl of Dunbar, Viscount of Drumcairn and Lord Hadykes in the Jacobite peerage on 2 February. He spent the following four years living in France.

Murray and Bishop Atterbury co-operated in Mar's final fall from Jacobite favour in 1724, though he and Atterbury later came into conflict. In 1725 Murray was recalled to Rome, arriving in the city in mid-September. He was made Protestant governor and tutor to the Charles Edward Stuart, the titular Prince of Wales, confirmed in the role on 4 June 1727. At the same time Murray's brother-in-law, John Hay of Cromlix, was made secretary of state, and his wife Marjorie (Murray's sister) was made Prince Charles' governess (though the Hays resigned their posts later in 1727). Murray was made a Knight of the Order of Thistle at some point in 1726. From 1727/8, Murray served as the Old Pretender's principal Secretary of State, but without ever being formally invested with the office.

In July 1734, Murray accompanied Prince Charles as an observer at the Siege of Gaeta and on the Prince's Italian tour in 1737. In 1740 Murray met the young Horace Walpole during his Grand Tour in Italy, who described Murray as "very sensible, very agreeable and well-bred. In 1744, Murray assisted Charles in leaving Italy prior to the Jacobite rising of 1745. Murray himself left Rome on 8 April 1747 with the intent of meeting Charles in Spain. However, he missed the rendezvous. That summer, Charles held Murray responsible for the decision of the Duke of York to receive holy orders, and Murray decided to leave the Jacobite court.

== Later life and death ==
He retired to Avignon, where there was a significant community of Jacobites, including his widowed sister; Murray lived there until his death. In 1751 he was received into the Roman Catholic Church and took holy orders. Dying unmarried in August 1770, he left the bulk of his property to Henry Benedict Stuart, and requested that 10,000 masses be said for the happy repose of his own soul. His Jacobite title was inherited by special remainder by his nephew, David Murray, 7th Viscount of Stormont, later Earl of Mansfield. His portrait, by Francesco Trevisani, is in the private collection at Scone Palace.

Political offices
Preceded by John Graeme	Jacobite Secretary of State; 1728–1747	Succeeded by Daniel O'Brien
Parliament of Great Britain
Preceded by William Grierson	Member of Parliament for Dumfriesshire; 1711–1713	Succeeded by Sir William Johnstone, Bt
Preceded by Alexander Reid	Member of Parliament for Elgin Burghs; 1713–1715	Succeeded by John Campbell
Peerage of Scotland
New title	— TITULAR — Earl of Dunbar; Jacobite peerage 1721–1770	Succeeded by David Murray
