= David Murray, 1st Viscount of Stormont =

Scottish courtier, comptroller of Scotland and captain of the king's guard

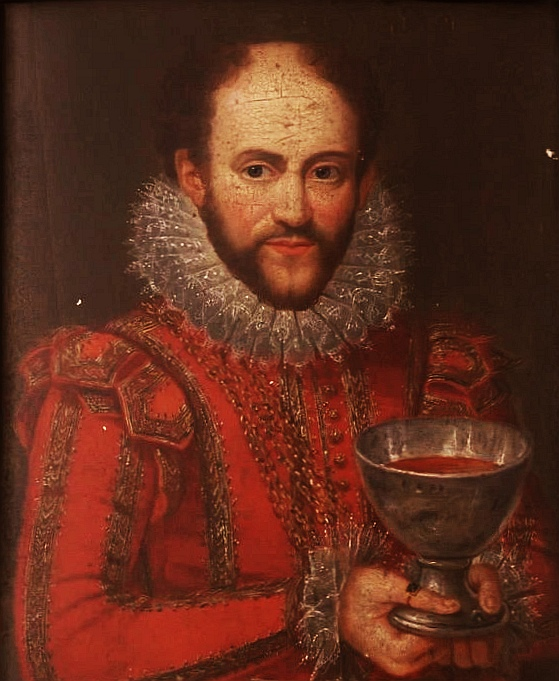
Portrait of "David Murray" 1st Lord Scone and Viscount Stormont at Scone Palace

David Murray, 1st Viscount of Stormont (died 27 August 1631) was a Scottish courtier, comptroller of Scotland and captain of the king's guard, known as Sir David Murray of Gospertie, then Lord Scone, and afterwards Viscount Stormont. He is known for his zeal in carrying out the ecclesiastical policy of James VI and I, in which he was effective if crude.

== Life ==
He was the second son of Sir Andrew Murray of Arngask and Balvaird, brother of William Murray of Tullibardine, by his second wife, Janet Graham, fourth daughter of William Graham, 2nd Earl of Montrose. He was brought up at the court of James VI, who made him his cupbearer in 1580, and master of the horse in 1583. On 12 December 1588 he presented a complaint against the inhabitants of Auchtermuchty, Fife, who, when he went to take possession of the lands of Auchtermuchty, attacked him and the gentlemen of his company, wounding him in various parts of the body, and cutting off one of the fingers of his right hand. At court he opposed the Octavians by creating trouble between them and the Scottish kirk. After he had been knighted by James VI (the date is uncertain) he was, on 26 April 1599, admitted on the privy council and made comptroller of the royal revenues, replacing George Home of Wedderburn in April 1599. He was also made steward of the stewartry of Fife. On 6 December 1599, while holding a court at Falkland, was attacked by neighbouring lairds and their servants.

Murray was at Perth at the time of the Gowrie conspiracy, 5 August 1600, and was subsequently credited with having been privy to the concoction of a semblance of a plot, aiming the overthrow of John Ruthven, 3rd Earl of Gowrie. He took a prominent part calming the inhabitants of Perth after Gowrie, their provost, was killed, and with others succeeded in bringing the king in safety to Falkland. Murray succeeded Gowrie as provost of Perth, and also obtained a grant of the barony of Ruthven, and of the lands belonging to the abbacy of Scone, of which Gowrie was commendator. In May 1601 he was appointed by the assembly of the kirk one of a commission to discuss how to support the kirk and clergy in all the districts of Scotland. On 10 Nov he obtained from the king the castle land of Falkland, with the office of ranger of the Lomonds and forester of the woods.

Murray was one of the retinue who attended King James in 1603 when he went to take possession of the English throne. On his return to Scotland on 11 August he obtained a commission for raising a guard or police of forty horsemen to be at the service of the privy council. He was one of the Scottish commissioners named by the parliament of Perth in 1604 to treat concerning a union with England, when he was created Viscount Stormont. On 1 April 1605 the barony of Ruthven and the lands belonging to the abbacy of Scone were erected into the temporal lordship of Scone, with a seat and vote in parliament, with which he was invested; on 30 May 1606 he had charter of the barony of Segie, erected into the lordship of Segie; and on 18 August 1608 of the lands and barony which belonged to abbacy of Scone, united into the temporal lordship of Scone.

In June 1605 Scone, as comptroller and captain of the guards, was appointed to proceed to Kintyre in Argyllshire to receive the obedience of the chiefs of the clans of the southern Hebrides, and payment of the king's rents and duties. He was one of the assessors for the trial at Linlithgow in January 1606 of the ministers concerned in the contumacious Aberdeen assembly of 1605. In March 1607 he was appointed one of the commissioners to represent the king in the synods of Perth and Fife, in connection with the scheme for the appointment of perpetual moderators. The synod of Perth having resisted his proposal for the appointment of Alexander Lindsay as perpetual moderator, he, in the king's name, dissolved the assembly, and as the members of the assembly resolved to proceed to the choice of their own moderator, a violent scene ensued. Scone, being asked by the moderator in the name of Christ to desist troubling the meeting, replied, 'The devil a Jesus is here.' After attempting by force to prevent the elected moderator taking the chair, Scone sent for the bailies of the town, and commanded them to ring the common bell and remove the rebels. On pretence of consulting the council of the city the bailies withdrew, but did not return, and avoided interference in the dispute. After the close of the sitting Scone locked the doors, but the assembly met in the open air and proceeded with their business. After Scone's contest with the synod of Perth, the synod of Fife, which should have met at Dysart on 28 April, was on the 23rd prorogued on pretence of the prevalence of the pestilence in the burgh. When it did meet, on 18 August, it also proved contumacious.

In November 1607 Scone was censured by the privy council for negligence in his duty as captain of the guard in not securing the arrest of the Earl of Crawford and the laird of Edzell, and he was also, on 2 February 1608, urged to adopt more energetic measures for the arrest of Lord Maxwell. Some time before March 1608 he was succeeded in the comptrollership by Sir James Hay of Fingask, but he still continued to hold the office of captain of the guard. As commissioner from the king he took part in the ecclesiastical conference at Falkland on 4 May 1609, in regard to the discipline of the kirk, and he was one of the lords of the articles for the parliament which met at Edinburgh in the following June. On 8 March 1609 he was appointed one of a commission for preventing the dilapidation of the bishoprics, and on the 23rd he was appointed, along with George Gledstanes, Archbishop of St. Andrews, to examine the charge against John Fairfull, minister of Dunfermline, of having prayed for the restoration of the banished ministers, with the result that Fairfull was found guilty. Scone was chosen one of the members of the privy council on its reconstruction, 20 January 1610, when it was limited to thirty-five members. On the institution of the office of justice of the peace in June 1610, he was appointed justice for the counties of Fife, Kinross, and Perth. On 15 November he was appointed one of the assessors to aid the Earl of Dunbar as treasurer. On 25 April 1611 an act was passed by the privy council disbanding the king's guard, but Scone was still to receive his pay as captain, and on 11 June he was authorised to retain nine of the guard for the apprehension of persons for the non-payment of taxes. Subsequently, the guard was placed under the command of Sir Robert Ker of Ancrum, and Scone had an act exonerating him for all he had done while holding the office of captain.

Scone was one of the three commissioners appointed by the king to the general assembly at Perth on 5 August 1618, when sanction was given to the Five Articles of Perth. He was also the king's commissioner to a conference between the bishops and presbyterian ministers at St. Andrews in August 1619. At the parliament held at Edinburgh in July 1621 he was chosen by the bishops one of the lords of the articles; and after the sanction by parliament of the five articles of the Perth assembly he the same night set off to London with the news. He was, by patent of 16 August, raised to the dignity of Viscount Stormont. On 19 May 1623 he was named one of a commission to sit in Edinburgh twice a week for the hearing of grievances. He died 27 August 1631, and was buried at Scone, where he had erected a monument to his memory designed by Maximilian Colt in 1618.

His epitaph at Scone includes: 'he helped his friends, who enjoy the fruits of his labour; his buildings proofs he was politique; good men knew he loved virtue, and malefactors that he maintained justice; he founded this hospital, and builded this church; his soul enjoys happiness; and under this tomb builded by himself, lies his body.'

== Family ==
Stormont had, on 20 July 1625, been served heir male and entire of Sir Andrew Murray of Balvaird, the son of his brother, and on 26 October of the same year made a settlement of the lordship of Scone and other estates to certain relatives of the name of Murray. As by his wife Elizabeth, daughter of David Beaton of Creich, Fife, he had no issue, he secured the succession of his titles to Sir Mungo Murray, son of John Murray, 1st Earl of Tullibardine, who had married his niece Anne, eldest daughter of Sir Andrew Murray of Arngask. To preserve his family of Balvaird in the line of heirs male he adopted his cousin's son, Sir Andrew Murray.

== Notes ==
Peerage of Scotland
New creation	Viscount of Stormont; 1621–1631	Succeeded by Mungo Murray
