= Lindsay baronets of Dowhill (1962) =

The Lindsay baronetcy, of Dowhill in the County of Kinross, was created in the Baronetage of the United Kingdom on 27 February 1962 for the soldier, explorer and Conservative politician Martin Lindsay. He was a descendant of Sir William Lindsay of Rossie, 1st of Dowhill (b. ca 1370), half-brother of David Lindsay, 1st Earl of Crawford.

== Lindsay baronets, of Dowhill (1962) ==
- Sir Martin Alexander Lindsay, 1st Baronet (1905–1981)
- Sir Ronald Alexander Lindsay, 2nd Baronet (1933–2004)
- Sir James Martin Evelyn Lindsay, 3rd Baronet (born 1968)

The heir apparent is the present holder's son Archibald Ronald Frederick Lindsay (born 2004).

Coat of arms of Lindsay baronets of Dowhill
| Crest A castle triple-towered Proper port Gules tower-caps Argent. Escutcheon Gules a fess chequy Argent and Azure between a mullet of the second in chief and the base barry undy Or and of the third in a dexter canton Argent a sinister hand couped apaume erect of the first. Supporters Two doves Proper gorged of collars chequy Argent and Azure. |
