= Mungo Murray, 7th Earl of Mansfield =

Scottish Unionist Party politician

The Right Honourable The Earl of Mansfield FLS FZS FSAScot FRHS JP DL
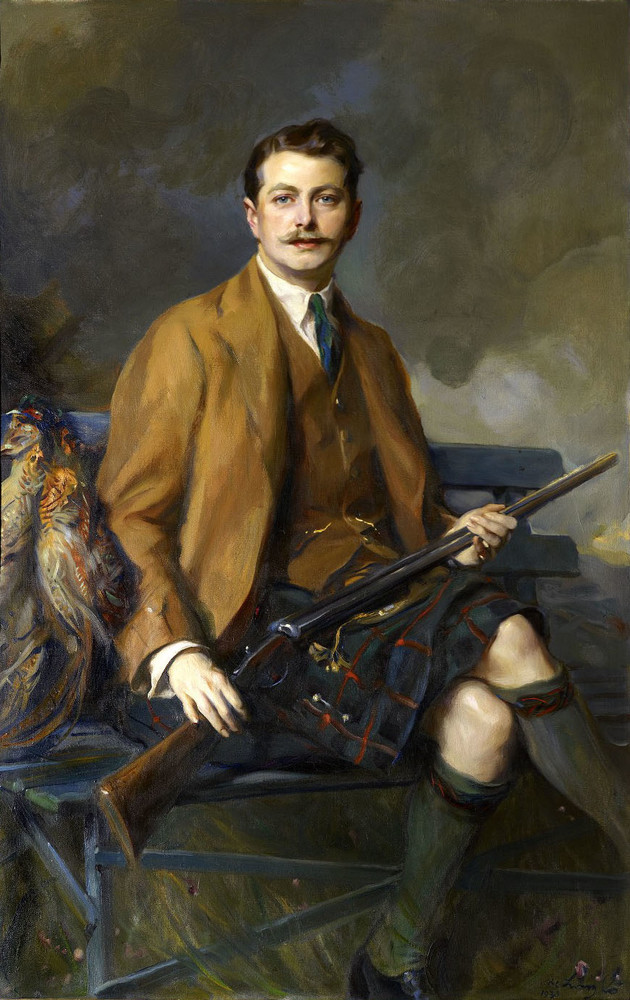
- Portrait of Lord Mansfield by Philip de László, 1930

Member of Parliament for Perth
- In office 1931–1935
- Preceded by: Noel Skelton
- Succeeded by: Francis Norie-Miller

Personal details
- Born: Mungo David Malcolm Murray; 9 August 1900
- Died: 2 September 1971 (aged 71)
- Party: Unionist
- Spouse: Dorothea Helena Carnegie (m. 1928; died 1971)
- Children: William Murray, 8th Earl of Mansfield; Malvina Stuart, Countess of Moray
- Parent(s): Alan Murray, 6th Earl of Mansfield; Margaret Helen Mary MacGregor
- Education: Christ Church, Oxford

Mungo David Malcolm Murray, 7th Earl of Mansfield, 6th Earl of Mansfield FLS FZS FSAScot FRHS JP DL (9 August 1900 – 2 September 1971), styled Lord Scone from 1906 to 1935, was a Scottish Unionist Party politician.

== Early life ==
Mansfield was the son of Alan David Murray, and Margaret Helen Mary MacGregor, who were first cousins. Upon the death of his unmarried uncle in 1906, his father became the Earl of Mansfield and young Mungo was styled Lord Scone.

His paternal grandparents were William Murray, Viscount Stormont (heir apparent to the 4th Earl of Mansfield) and Emily Louisa MacGregor (a daughter of Sir John Murray-Macgregor, 3rd Baronet). His uncle, William Murray, 5th Earl of Mansfield, who was a friend of King Edward VII, was known as "The most eligible bachelor" in London, and threw lavish parties at Kenwood House. His maternal grandparents were Rear-Admiral Sir Malcolm Murray-MacGregor, 4th Baronet and Lady Helen Laura McDonnell (a daughter of the 4th Earl of Antrim). His paternal grandmother was the sister of his maternal grandfather.

He graduated from Christ Church, Oxford, in 1922.

== Career ==
He was active in the extreme anti-Catholic Scottish Protestant League before breaking with them following the 1929 United Kingdom general election. This came about when the SPL leader Alexander Ratcliffe offered to support the Unionist candidate for Stirling and Falkirk if he supported the partial repeal of the Education (Scotland) Act 1918 which allowed Catholic schools into the state system funded through education rates. When this didn't happen Ratcliffe stood as an 'Independent Protestant', coming in third behind the Unionist and Labour Party candidates.

Scone entered Parliament for Perth in 1931, a seat he held until 1935, when he succeeded his father and entered the House of Lords. He was also Governor of the Edinburgh and East of Scotland College of Agriculture from 1925 to 1930, Lord High Commissioner to the General Assembly of the Church of Scotland from 1961 to 1962 and Lord-Lieutenant of Perthshire from 1960 to 1971.

In 1933 he was one of eleven people, (Note: The letter was signed: Desborough; Hugh S. Gladstone; Grey of Fallodon; Julian S. Huxley (Chancellor of Oxford University); T. G. Longstaff; Percy R. Lowe; P. Chalmers Mitchell; Rothschild; Scone M.P. (Chairman, British Trust for Ornithology); E. L. Turner; H. F. Witherby (President, British Ornithologists' Union)) involved in the appeal that led to the foundation of the British Trust for Ornithology (BTO), an organisation for the study of birds in the British Isles, of which he became the founding chairman. He was appointed Fellow, Linnean Society, a Fellow, Zoologicial Society, a Fellow, Society of Antiquaries, Scotland, and a Fellow, Royal Horticultural Society. He also served as a Justice of the Peace for Perthshire, Dumfries-shire and was Deputy Lieutenant of Dumfries-shire in 1947.

== Personal life ==
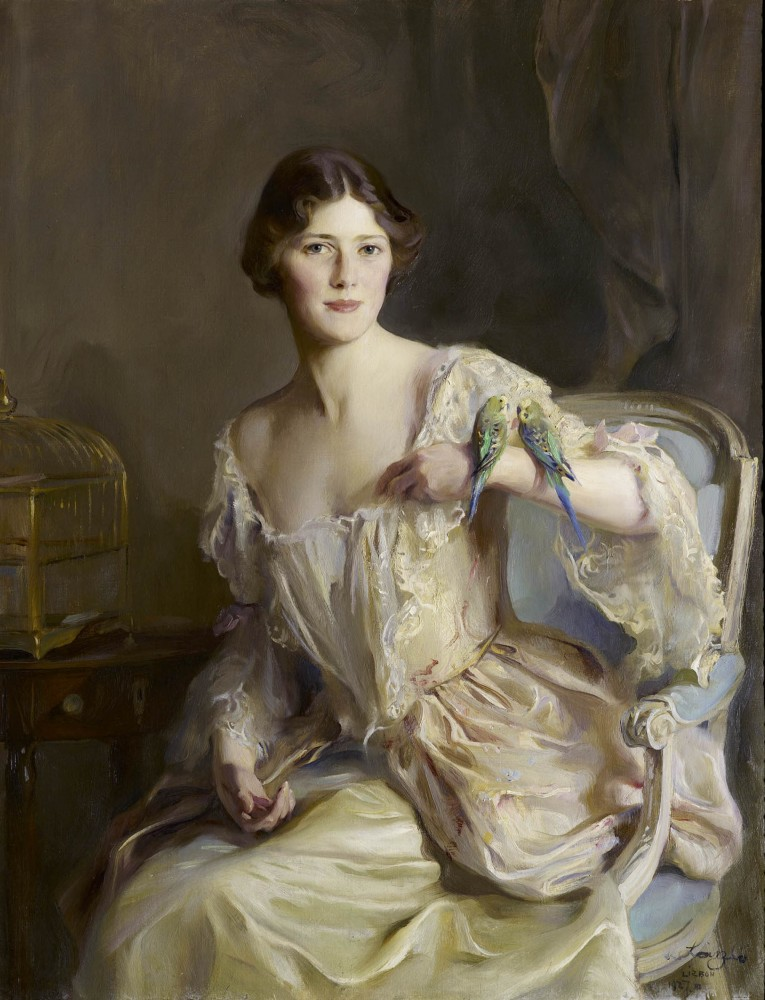
Dorothea Murray, Countess of Mansfield, née Dorothea Helena Carnegie, by Philip de László, 1930

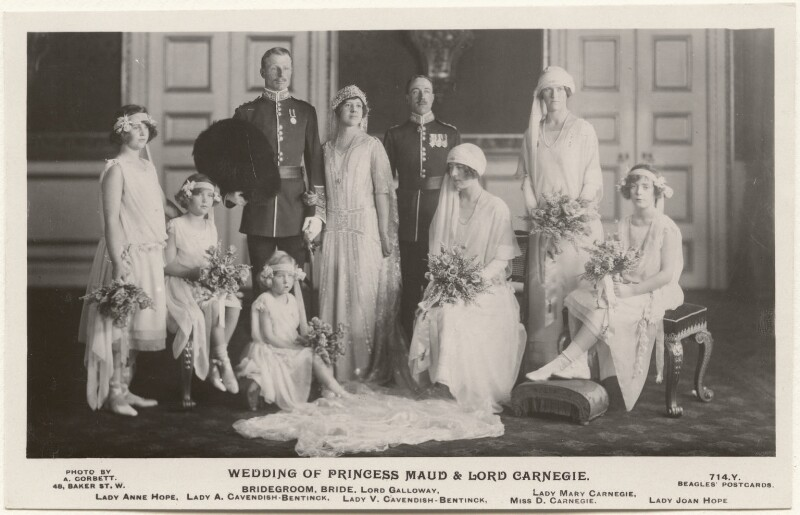
Wedding of Princess Maud & Charles Carnegie, 11th Earl of Southesk. Dorothea was half first cousin to the 11th Earl. (she was the second from the right)

In 1928, Lord Mansfield married Dorothea Helena Carnegie, a younger daughter of the British diplomat Sir Lancelot Carnegie (second son of James Carnegie, 9th Earl of Southesk). Dorothea was a half first cousin to Charles Carnegie, 11th Earl of Southesk and was a part of his 1923 wedding to Princess Maud (daughter of Louise, Princess Royal and the 1st Duke of Fife). Together, they were the parents of:

- William David Mungo James Murray, 8th Earl of Mansfield (1930–2015), who married Pamela Joan Foster, a daughter of Wilfred Neill Foster and Millicent Agnes Mary Duckham, in 1955.
- Lady Malvina Dorothea Murray (b. 1936), who married Douglas Stuart, 20th Earl of Moray, in 1964.
- Lady Mariota Cecilia Murray (1945–2001), who was admitted to Inner Temple; she married Hon. Charles Malcolm Napier, son of Lt.-Col. William Napier, 13th Lord Napier, in 1969.

Mansfield died in September 1971, aged 71, and was succeeded in his titles by his only son William. The Countess of Mansfield died in 1985.

== Notes ==
Parliament of the United Kingdom
Preceded by Noel Skelton	Member of Parliament for Perth; 1931–1935	Succeeded by Francis Norie-Miller
Honorary titles
Preceded by The Lord Kinnaird	Lord-Lieutenant of Perthshire; 1960–1971	Succeeded by David Henry Butter
Peerage of Great Britain
Preceded by Alan David Murray	Earl of Mansfield and Mansfield; 1935–1971	Succeeded by William Murray
