= William Lindsay (diplomat) =

Scottish diplomat and colonial governor

William Lindsay (died 1796) was a Scottish diplomat and colonial governor. He was the second son of Sir David Lindsay of Evelick, of the Lindsay of Evelix family. He served as Great Britain's Resident to the Republic of Venice, as well as the Governor of Tobago from 1795. He died in office on 22 May 1796.

Like his elder brother John, Lindsay predeceased their father, and so David's titles passed to the third son, Charles.

== Sources ==
- http://www.perthshireheritage.co.uk/evelick.html

Diplomatic posts
Preceded by Sir Francis Vincent, Bt	British Resident to the Republic of Venice; 1791–1793	Succeeded by Francis Drake
Government offices
Preceded by George Poyntz Ricketts	Governor of Tobago; 1795–1796	Succeeded by James Campbell
