= Lord Balvaird =

Lord Balvaird is a title in the Peerage of Scotland. It was created the 17th of November 1641 for Sir Andrew Murray, who was at that time also the feudal Lord of Balvaird. Before receiving that title, he was knighted by Charles the First in Scotland during his coronation in 1633. His son, the second Lord, succeeded as fourth Viscount Stormont in 1658, according to a special remainder in the letters patent.

The latter's great-grandson, the seventh Viscount, succeeded his uncle as second Earl of Mansfield in 1793, also according to a special remainder in the letters patent.

== Lords Balvaird (1641) ==
- Andrew Murray, 1st Lord Balvaird (d. 1644)
- David Murray, 2nd Lord Balvaird (d. 1668) (succeeded as Viscount Stormont in 1658)

See the Viscount Stormont and the Earl of Mansfield for further succession.
