= John Hay of Cromlix =

Jacobite soldier and courtier

John Hay of Cromlix Duke of Inverness
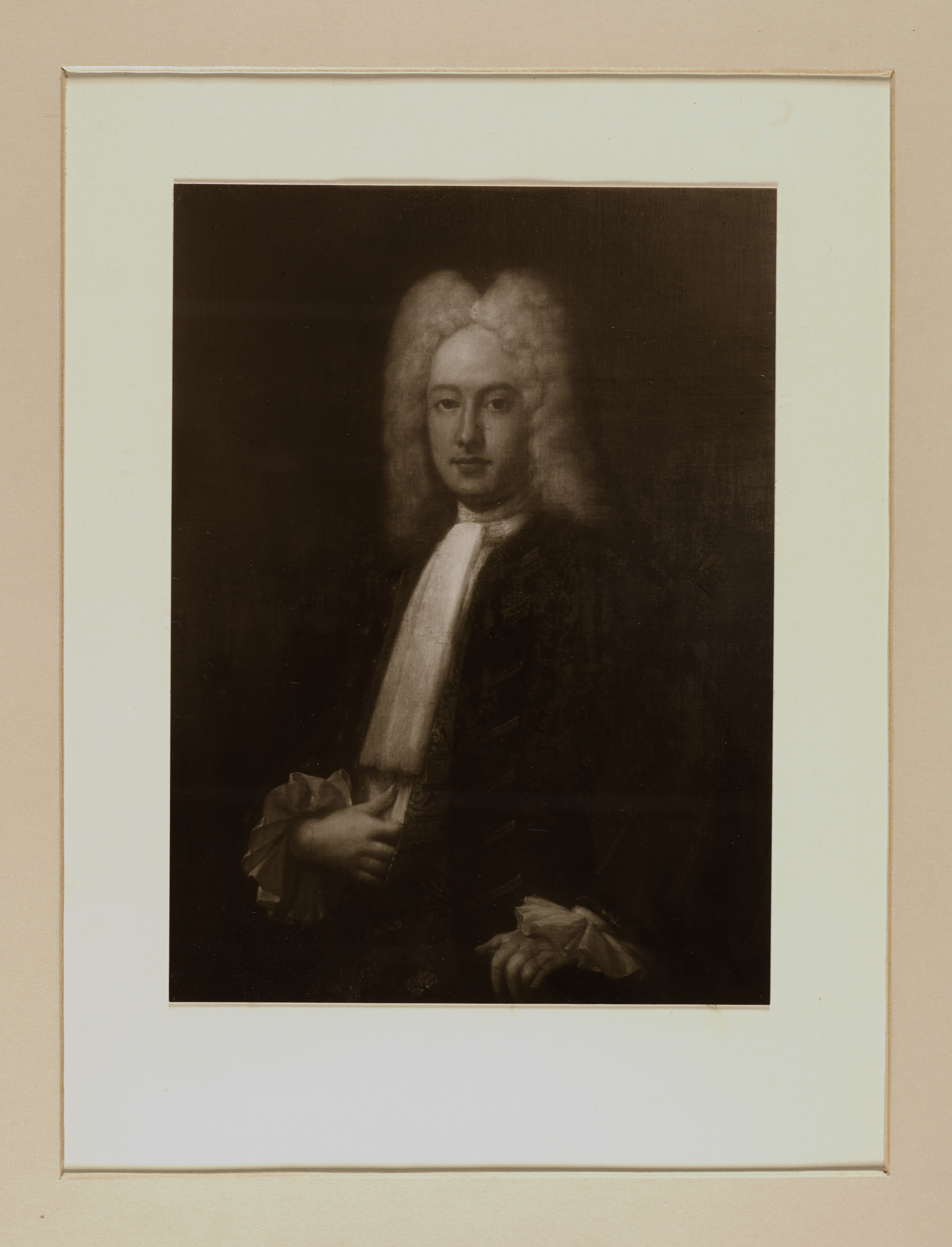
- Portrait of John Hay of Cromlix from a Jacobite broadside

Jacobite Secretary of State
- In office 1724–1727
- Monarch: James III & VIII
- Preceded by: John Erskine, Earl of Mar
- Succeeded by: John Graeme

Personal details
- Born: 1691
- Died: 1740 (aged 48–49) Avignon, France
- Parents: Thomas Hay, 7th Earl of Kinnoull (father); Marjorie Murray (mother)
- Profession: Soldier and courtier

John Hay of Cromlix (1691–1740) was a Scottish Jacobite army officer and courtier in the service of James Francis Edward Stuart (known as the "Old Pretender" by his opponents, and "James III & VIII" to his followers). He was from the Clan Hay. He was made Jacobite Duke of Inverness by James in 1727, having served as Jacobite Secretary of State.

== Early life ==
His parents were Thomas Hay, seventh earl of Kinnoull (c.1660–1719) and Elizabeth (née Drummond, 1669–1696). He was their third son, with their first son, George (d. 1758), succeeding their father. The family was sympathetic to the Stuart kings, but felt that being Protestant, serving Queen Anne and supporting the Harley administration did not mar this sympathy and loyalty.

Hay's maternal grandfather William Drummond, first viscount of Strathallan, bequeathed Hay an estate at Cromlix, Perthshire. Hay purchased a commission in command of a foot guards company in 1714 and a year later married Marjorie Murray (d. in or after 1765), daughter of David Murray, fifth Viscount Stormont, and sister of the Earl of Mansfield and the Jacobite James Murray, "Earl of Dunbar". He commanded a troop of Jacobite horsemen involved in the taking of Perth on 16 September 1715 during the Jacobite rising of that year, before fleeing to the continent.

== Jacobite courtier ==
Hay arrived from Paris at the exiled Jacobite court in Rome on 26 May 1717. Two days later, he visited Pope Pius VI and kissed the Pontiff's foot. In February 1718, he was made a groom of the bedchamber to James. On 5 October 1718, James created Hay Earl of Inverness, Viscount of Innerpaphrie and Lord Cromlix and Erne in the Jacobite Scottish peerage. James appointed him his Secretary of State in 1725, and his wife and brother-in-law governess and tutor to the royal children at the same time. Thus John Hay and John Murray became known as the "King's favourites". Hay and his wife exerted considerable influence at the factious Jacobite court.

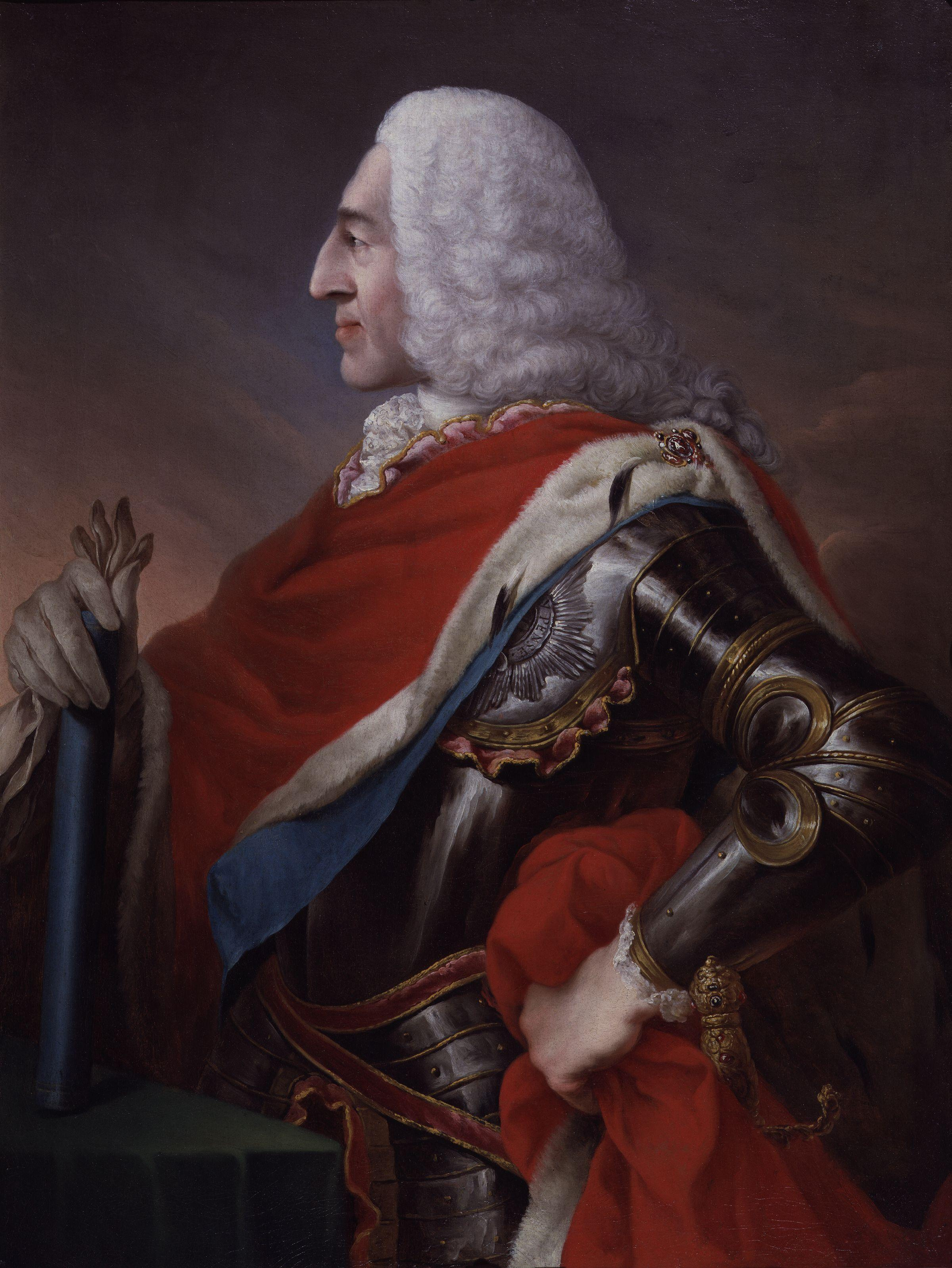
"James III & VIII", whom Hay served under as Jacobite Secretary of State. Painted by Louis Gabriel Blanchet, 1741.

In 1725, James and his wife, Clementina Sobieska, separated for over a year. Hay was one of the primary causes of this split, with Clementina accusing Hay and his wife of treating her poorly, and imposing his Protestant faith onto her children, Charles and Henry. Furthermore, Clementina alleged that Hay's wife, Marjorie, was a mistress to James. These complaints may, however, have been influenced somewhat by the children's former governess Mrs Sheldon, sister-in-law of John Erskine, 6th Earl of Mar. Mar's failed rebellion in 1715 and further intrigues had eventually led to his being replaced by Hay as James's intermediary between the exiled Jacobites and those still in Britain, and Mar had sworn revenge on Hay for this loss of royal favour. However, other Jacobites' correspondence suggests that some ill-treatment of Clementina by the Hays did occur, though the suggestion that Lady Inverness and James were having an affair, with Lord Inverness turning a blind eye, is more than likely a rumour started by both Mar and the British government to discredit both Hay and James. Whatever the reasons for Clementina's retirement, however, it led to alienation between James and his supporters in Britain as well as with two of his primary benefactors, Pope Benedict XIII and the King of Spain.James reluctantly accepted Hay's resignation as Secretary of State in 1727, upon which Clementina left the convent but threatened to return at any time should her husband or his court step out of line. James nevertheless elevated Hay in April 1727 to the titular Dukedom of Inverness and further created him Baron Hay in the Jacobite Peerage of England.

== Later life ==
Hay moved out of active political involvement into retirement in the Jacobite colony in Avignon, France by 1738, to which James Murray also retired later. In that year, with his brother William garnering European support for James and a Jacobite invasion of Britain, and Anglo-French relations on the slide, Thomas wrote to Dr. Robin Wright, James Francis Edward Stuart's physician, stating:

Avignon Jany. 13th, 1738. You could not have done me a greater pleasure my Dear Doctor than by the particular account you give me of the health of the Royal family, tho I hear every week from Rome, yet on that while which is to me the principal ones. Your letter is my authentick, I thank you my Dear sir for your good wishes on the new year and may God that before the end of it wee may be all home and that I may see you the gift of your profession in England which I don't despair of. Ly. Inverness makes you many complts. and is ever mindfull and gratefull for the many essential services you have rendered her. Do me the justice to believe me att all times my Dear Doctor. Your most Obedt. humble Servt., Inverness

While in Avignon, Hay and his wife converted to Roman Catholicism, much to the displeasure of many Protestant Jacobites, such as Francis Atterbury. Hay and his wife made a trip to Italy in 1730–1. Hay died in Avignon in 1740.

Political offices
Preceded by John Erskine, Earl of Mar	Jacobite Secretary of State; 1724–1727	Succeeded by John Graeme
Peerage of Scotland
New creation	— TITULAR — Duke of Inverness; Jacobite peerage 1727–1740	Extinct
New creation	— TITULAR — Earl of Inverness; Jacobite peerage 1718–1740	Extinct
Peerage of England
New creation	— TITULAR — Baron Hay; Jacobite peerage 1727–1740	Extinct
