= Earl of Mansfield =

Peerages of Great Britain

Earldom of Mansfield
- Quarterly, 1st and 4th, az. three stars Argent within a double tressure flory counterflory Or (for Murray); 2nd and 3rd gu. three crosses patté Argent (for Barclay, of Balvaird)
- Creation date: 1776 and 1792
- Created by: George III
- Peerage: Peerage of Great Britain
- First holder: William Murray, 1st Baron Mansfield
- Present holder: Alexander Murray, 9th Earl of Mansfield
- Heir apparent: William Murray, Viscount Stormont
- Subsidiary titles: Viscount of Stormont; Lord Balvaird; Lord Scone
- Seat: Scone Palace
- Former seats: Balvaird Castle; Kenwood House
- Motto: Uni aequus virtuti ("Friendly in virtue alone"); Spero meliora ("I aspire to greater things")

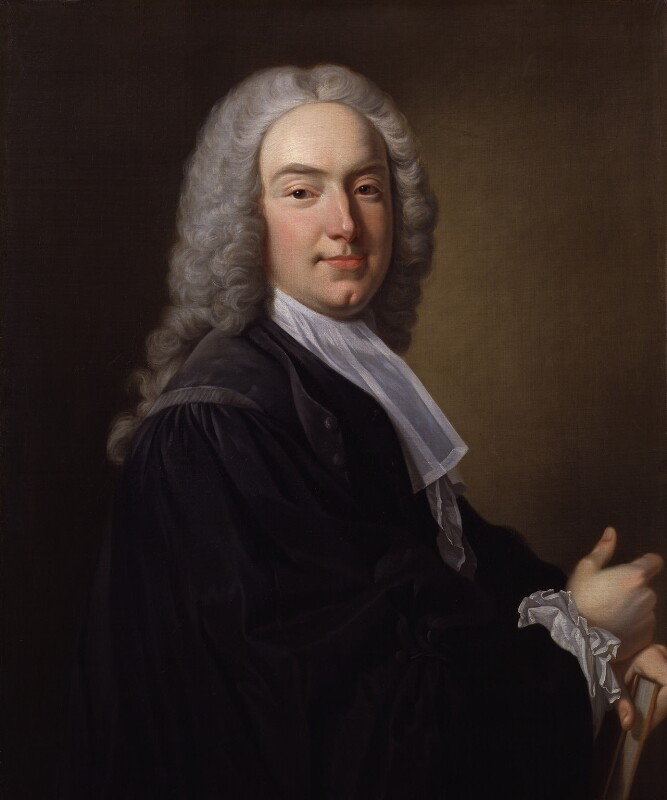
A c. 1737 portrait of William Murray, 1st Earl of Mansfield by Jean-Baptiste van Loo

Earl of Mansfield, in the County of Nottingham, and Earl of Mansfield, in the County of Middlesex, are two titles in the Peerage of Great Britain that have been united under a single holder since 1843.

== History ==
The titles Earl of Mansfield (in the County of Nottingham) and Earl of Mansfield (in the County of Middlesex) were created in 1776 and 1792, respectively, for the Scottish lawyer and judge William Murray, 1st Baron Mansfield, fourth son of David Murray, 5th Viscount of Stormont (see Viscount of Stormont for the earlier history of the family). He was Lord Chief Justice of the King's Bench from 1756 to 1788. Murray had already been created Baron Mansfield, in the County of Nottingham, in the Peerage of Great Britain in 1756, with normal remainder to the heirs male of his body. The two earldoms were created with different remainders. The 1776 earldom was created with remainder to Louisa Murray (née Cathcart), Lady Stormont (daughter of Charles Schaw Cathcart, 9th Lord Cathcart), second wife of his nephew David Murray, 7th Viscount of Stormont, while the 1792 earldom (referring to a fictitious Mansfield in Middlesex to differentiate it from the first earldom) was created with remainder to his nephew Lord Stormont.

Lord Mansfield was childless and on his death in 1793, the barony became extinct. He was succeeded in the 1776 earldom according to the special remainder by his nephew's wife Louisa, the second Countess, and in the 1792 earldom according to the special remainder by his nephew Lord Stormont, who became the second Earl. The latter was a noted politician in his own right and served as Lord Justice General, Secretary of State for the Northern Department and Lord President of the Council. He was succeeded by his and Louisa's eldest son, the third Earl (of the 1792 creation). He was Lord Lieutenant of Clackmannanshire. On his death, the title passed to his son, the fourth Earl (of the 1792 creation). He was a Tory politician and served as a Lord of the Treasury from 1834 to 1835 in the first administration of Sir Robert Peel. In 1843, he succeeded his grandmother the second Countess of Mansfield (who had outlived her husband by forty-seven years) and became in addition the third Earl of Mansfield of the 1776 creation.

He was succeeded by his grandson, the fifth and fourth Earl. He was the eldest son of William David Murray, Viscount of Stormont. He died unmarried and was succeeded by his younger brother, the sixth and fifth Earl. His son, the seventh and sixth Earl, represented Perth in the House of Commons and served as Lord Lieutenant of Perthshire. The eighth and seventh Earl of Mansfield held office in the Conservative government of Margaret Thatcher as a Minister of State at the Scottish Office from 1979 to 1983, and at the Northern Ireland Office from 1983 to 1984.

The titles are presently held by his elder son, the ninth Earl of Mansfield of the 1792 creation and the eighth Earl of Mansfield of the 1776 creation. He is also the fifteenth Viscount of Stormont, the fifteenth Lord Scone and the thirteenth Lord Balvaird.

The family seat is Scone Palace, near Scone, Perthshire. The Earl of Mansfield is the Hereditary Keeper of Bruce's Castle of Lochmaben. The family also owned Kenwood House in London from 1754 to 1925.

== Earls of Mansfield, in the County of Middlesex (1792) ==
- William Murray, 1st Earl of Mansfield, 1st Earl of Mansfield (1705–1793)
- David Murray, 2nd Earl of Mansfield (1727–1796)
- David William Murray, 3rd Earl of Mansfield (1777–1840)
- William David Murray, 4th Earl of Mansfield, 3rd Earl of Mansfield (1806–1898)
- William David Murray, 5th Earl of Mansfield, 4th Earl of Mansfield (1860–1906)
- Alan David Murray, 6th Earl of Mansfield, 5th Earl of Mansfield (1864–1935)
- Mungo David Malcolm Murray, 7th Earl of Mansfield, 6th Earl of Mansfield (1900–1971)
- William David Mungo James Murray, 8th Earl of Mansfield, 7th Earl of Mansfield (1930–2015)
- Alexander David Mungo Murray, 9th Earl of Mansfield, 8th Earl of Mansfield (b. 1956)

== Present peer ==
Alexander David Mungo Murray, 9th Earl of Mansfield (born 17 October 1956) is the elder son of the 8th Earl and his wife Pamela Joan Foster and was educated at Eton College. From 1971 he was formally styled as Viscount Stormont. On 21 October 2015 he succeeded as Earl of Mansfield (created 1776 and 1792), Lord Scone (1604), Lord Balvaird, and Viscount of Stormont (1621).

In 1985, he married Sophia Mary Veronica Ashbrooke, and they had four children:

- Lady Isabella Mary Alexandra Murray (born 1987)
- William Philip David Mungo Murray, Viscount Stormont (born 1988), heir apparent
- Lady Iona Margaret Sophia Murray (born 1992)
- Lady Louisa Frederica Olivia Murray (born 1996)

== Earls of Mansfield, in the County of Nottingham (1776) ==
- William Murray, 1st Earl of Mansfield, 1st Earl of Mansfield (1705–1793)
- Louisa Murray, 2nd Countess of Mansfield (1758–1843)
- William David Murray, 4th Earl of Mansfield, 3rd Earl of Mansfield (1806–1898)

William David Murray and his heirs (as Earls of Mansfield, in the County of Nottingham) are identical to the Earls of Mansfield, in the County of Middlesex.

== Dramatic recreations ==
- Let Justice Be Done Mixed Blessings Theatre Group. 2008 play featuring part of the Earl of Mansfield story
