= Andrew Murray, 1st Lord Balvaird =

The Right Honourable The Lord Balvaird
- Born: 1597?
- Died: 1644
- Education: University of St Andrews
- Occupation: Minister
- Title: 1st Lord Balvaird
- Spouse: Elizabeth Carnegie
- Children: 5 sons, 4 daughters
- Parent(s): David Murray of Balgonie, Fifeshire; Agnes, daughter of Moncrieff of Moncrieff

Sir Andrew Murray, 1st Lord Balvaird (1597?–1644) was a Scottish minister of Abdie in Fife, and the only minister of the Church of Scotland on whom a knighthood or peerage was conferred.

== Life ==
He was the second son of David Murray of Balgonie, Fifeshire, by Agnes, daughter of Moncrieff of Moncrieff. He was educated at the University of St Andrews, where he graduated M.A. in 1618. In 1622 he was presented by his grandfather, Sir David Murray, 1st Viscount Stormont, to the church of Abdie, to which he was admitted on 1 October.

On the death of his grandfather in 1631 he succeeded to the baronies of Arngask and Kippo in Fifeshire. During the visit of Charles I to Scotland for his coronation in 1633 he was, on 15 June, dubbed a knight at Seton. He was also the feudal Lord of Balvaird.

Murray was the second of those who, in February 1638, signed the covenant in Greyfriars Church, Edinburgh. Although his name was also inserted as supporting the libel against the bishops in the same year, he may not have concurred with it. At a meeting of the assembly of the kirk in the same year, he, although not a member, tried to modify the attitude of the extremists towards the king's proposals. The high commissioner, the Marquis of Hamilton, reported this to the king, and on 17 November 1641 Murray was created a peer by the title of Lord Balvaird.

As a peer, Balvaird attended a meeting of the convention of estates, but on 10 August 1643 it was decided by the assembly of the kirk that he should keep his ministry, and give up speaking in parliament. On the death of Mungo Murray, 2nd Viscount of Stormont in March 1642, Balvaird succeeded to the lands, lordship, and barony of Stormont, but not to the title. He died on 24 September 1644, aged about 47.

Twenty years later, Murray's son, Andrew, built Murrayshall House. His family, which became the Murray-Grahams, stayed in the house for 260 years.

== Family ==
By his wife Lady Elizabeth Carnegie, daughter of David Carnegie, 1st Earl of Southesk, he had five sons and three daughters.

The sons were:

- David Murray, 2nd Lord Balvaird, who on the death of James Murray, 2nd Earl of Annandale, in 1658, succeeded to the titles of Viscount Stormont and Lord Scone;
- Sir Andrew Murray of Pitlochrie;
- the Hon. James Murray, M.D., a physician;
- Sir John Murray of Drumcairne, who was appointed a lord of session in October 1681, and a lord of justiciary in July 1687, but at the Glorious Revolution was deprived of all his offices; and
- the Hon. William Murray, an advocate at the Scottish bar.

The daughters were:

- Catherine;
- Marjory, married to Sir Alexander Gibson of Durie, a lord of session; and
- Barbara, married to Patrick, lord Gray.

== Notes ==
Peerage of Scotland
New title	Lord Balvaird; 1641–1644	Succeeded by David Murrary

Attribution

This article incorporates text from a publication now in the public domain: Lee, Sidney, ed. (1894). "Murray, Andrew (1597-1644)". Dictionary of National Biography. Vol. 39. London: Smith, Elder & Co.
