= William Murray, 8th Earl of Mansfield =

British nobleman and Conservative politician (1930–2015)

The Right Honourable The Earl of Mansfield and Mansfield
- Born: 7 July 1930
- Died: 21 October 2015 (aged 85)
- Education: Eton College
- Alma mater: Christ Church, Oxford
- Occupations: Barrister, politician
- Title: 8th Earl of Mansfield and 7th Earl of Mansfield
- Spouse: Pamela Foster
- Children: 2 sons, 1 daughter
- Parent(s): Mungo Murray, 7th Earl of Mansfield and Mansfield; Dorothea Helena Carnegie
- Relatives: Lancelot Carnegie (maternal grandfather)

William David Mungo James Murray, 8th Earl of Mansfield, 7th Earl of Mansfield, DL, JP (7 July 1930 – 21 October 2015), styled Lord Scone until 1970, was a British nobleman and Conservative politician.

== Biography ==
William Murray was born on 7 July 1930. He was the only son of Mungo Murray, 7th Earl of Mansfield and Mansfield, and his wife Dorothea Helena, younger daughter of Sir Lancelot Carnegie. He was educated at Eton College and Christ Church, Oxford. He served with the Scots Guards in Malaya from 1949 to 1950. He was called to the bar, Inner Temple, in 1958.

Murray was a barrister from 1958 until 1971, when he succeeded his father as Earl of Mansfield.

He was a member of the British Delegation to the European Parliament from 1973 to 1975 (prior to the direct election of Members of the European Parliament), and was an opposition spokesman in the House of Lords from 1975 to 1979. He was a Minister of State in the Scottish Office from 1979 to 1983 and in the Northern Ireland Office from 1983 to 1984.

He was appointed an Honorary Sheriff of Perthshire in 1974, a Justice of the Peace in 1975 and a Deputy Lieutenant for Perth and Kinross in 1980.

Murray has also held a number of business and charitable appointments, such as serving as first president of the Federation of Hunting Associations of the European Communities (FACE) from 1977 to 1979.

He was the first President of the Scottish Association for the Care and Resettlement of Offenders and from 1985 to 1996 served as First Crown Estate Commissioner.

He succeeded as the 11th Lord Balvaird on 2 September 1971 and he succeeded as the 13th Lord Scone on 2 September 1971. He was also the feudal Baron of Balvaird.

== Marriage and children ==
Murray married Pamela Joan Foster on 19 December 1955. They had three children:

- Alexander David Mungo Murray, 9th Earl of Mansfield and Mansfield (born 17 October 1956)
- Lady Georgina Dorothea Murray (born 10 March 1967), married to John Bullough
- Hon James William Murray (born 7 June 1969)

The Countess was a Patroness of the Royal Caledonian Ball. She died on 2 October 2022, at the age of 87.

== Death ==
Murray died on 21 October 2015 and his funeral and memorial service were held at St John's Kirk of Perth on 30 October 2015, with a wake at Scone Palace. He was succeeded by his son Alexander David Mungo Murray.

== Ancestry ==
Ancestors of William Murray, 8th Earl of Mansfield

16. William Murray, 4th Earl of Mansfield and Mansfield
8. William Murray, Viscount Stormont
17. Louisa Ellison
4. Alan Murray, 6th Earl of Mansfield and Mansfield
18. Sir John Murray-MacGregor, 3rd Baronet, of Lanrick
9. Emily MacGregor
19. Mary Hardy
2. Mungo Murray, 7th Earl of Mansfield and Mansfield
20. Sir John Murray-MacGregor, 3rd Baronet, of Lanrick
10. Sir Malcolm Murray-MacGregor, 4th Baronet, of Lanrick
21. Mary Hardy
5. Margaret MacGregor
22. Hugh McDonnell, 4th Earl of Antrim
11. Lady Helen McDonnell
23. Lady Laura Parker
1. William Murray, 8th Earl of Mansfield and Mansfield
24. Sir James Carnegie, 5th Baronet, of Pittarrow
12. James Carnegie, 9th Earl of Southesk
25. Charlotte Lysons
6. Hon. Lancelot Carnegie
26. Alexander Murray, 6th Earl of Dunmore
13. Lady Susan Murray
27. Lady Catherine Herbert
3. Dorothea Carnegie
?
14. Henry Barclay
?
7. Marion Barclay
30. Samuel Gurney
15. Richenda Gurney
31. Elizabeth Sheppard

Peerage of Great Britain
Preceded by Mungo Murray	Earl of Mansfield and Mansfield; 1971–2015	Succeeded by Alexander Murray
