= Margaret Lindsay Ramsay =

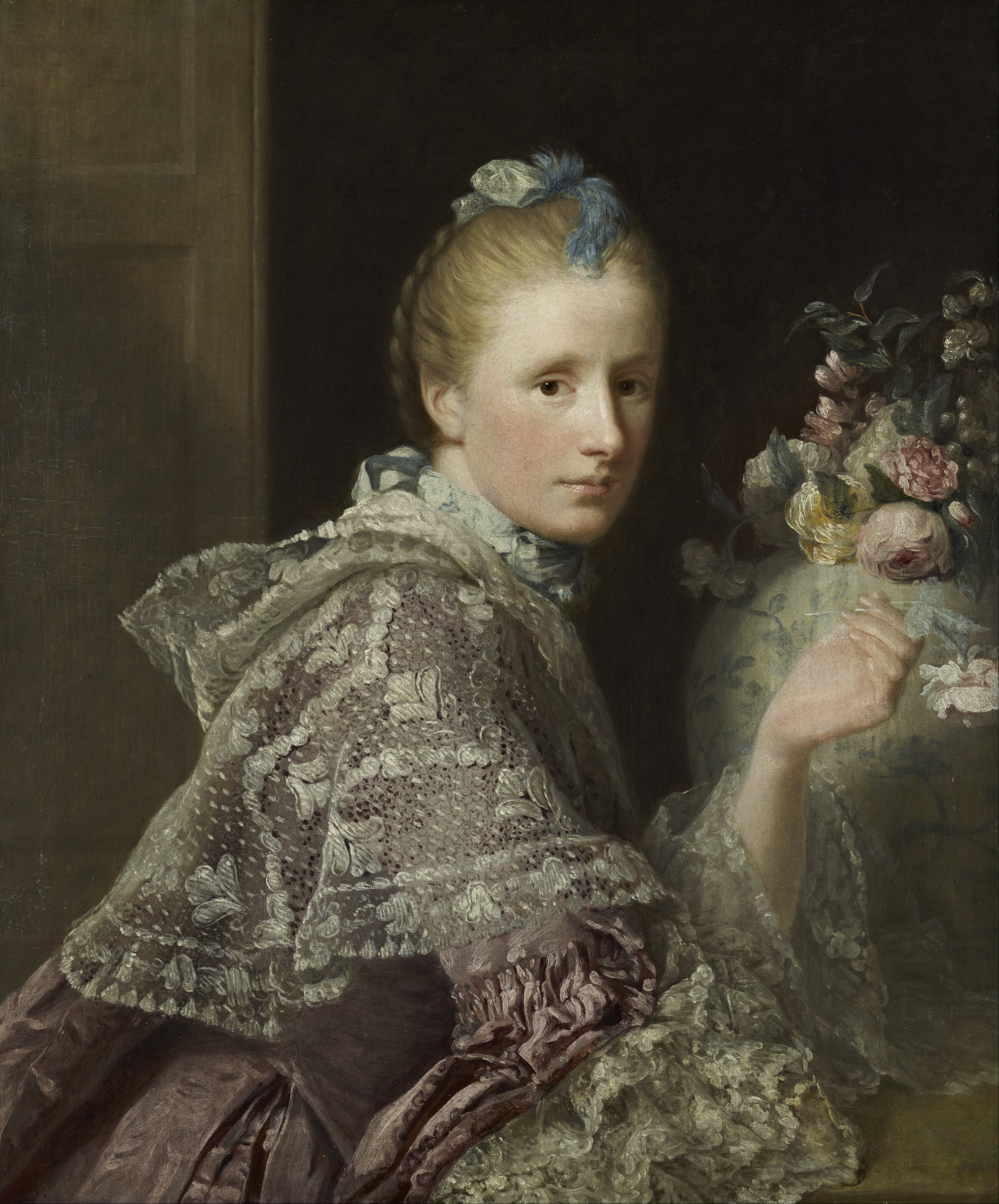
- Margaret Lindsay by Allan Ramsay (Scottish National Gallery)
- Born: c. 1726
- Died: 1782
- Spouse: Allan Ramsay
- Children: 3
- Parents: Sir Alexander Lindsay, 3rd Baronet; Amelia Murray
- Relatives: John Lindsay (brother); Dido Elizabeth Belle (niece)
- Family: Clan Lindsay; Clan Murray

See Margaret Lindsay for the film actress of this name, and Marion Margaret Violet Lindsay for the 19th and 20th-century artist, sometimes called Margaret Lindsay.

Margaret Lindsay (c. 1726–1782) was a member of the Scottish Clan Murray and the eldest daughter of Sir Alexander Lindsay of Evelick and Hon. Amelia Murray (d. 1774). She was a member of the Clan Lindsay, which joined the 1715 Jacobite rising. In 1752, she married the artist Allan Ramsay, later becoming the subject of several of his works.

Her marriage was a controversial one within her family. Their elopement on March 1, 1752, at Canongate Kirk, Edinburgh, made Lindsay Ramsay the artist's second wife, and the marriage did not have her parents' consent. Her parents never forgave her for marrying lower than her station, but her brother John stayed loyal to her right up to his death. Allan Ramsay wrote to his new father-in-law to reassure him that, despite already having a daughter from his first marriage and two sisters to support, he could provide Margaret with an annual sum of £100 that would rise "as my affairs increase, and I thank God, they are in a way of increasing." However, he was fully aware that she was "entitled to much more than ever I shall have to bestow upon her," and reiterated that he had not married Margaret for her money but out of love.

Their marriage was a long and happy one which produced three surviving children – Amelia (1755–1813), Charlotte (1758–1818), and John (1768–1845). Other children died as babies: twins Alexander and Amelia, born 1752, and another Alexander, born 1754.

== Portrait ==
In 1758 Ramsay painted his wife's portrait, now known as The Artist's Wife: Margaret Lindsay of Evelick, c 1726 - 1782. The painting is held in the National Galleries of Scotland, along with several preparatory sketches.

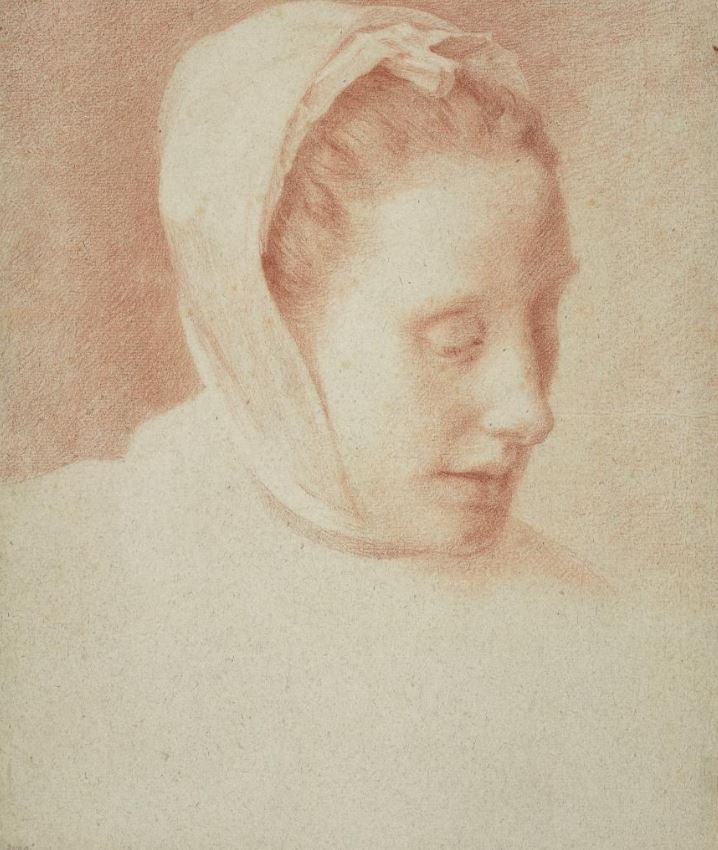
Head of Margaret Lindsay Looking Down, by Allan Ramsay, about 1776. Red chalk with white heightening on grey paper, Scottish National Gallery
