= William Murray, 5th Earl of Mansfield =

William David Murray, 5th Earl of Mansfield, 4th Earl of Mansfield, PC (20 July 1860 – 29 April 1906) was a British peer.

== Early life ==
The son of William David Murray, Viscount Stormont, Mansfield succeeded to the family earldoms on the death of his grandfather, William Murray, 4th Earl of Mansfield, in 1898. The 5th Earl, who was known as 'The most eligible bachelor' in London, he threw lavish parties at Kenwood House.

== Career ==
He served in the Grenadier Guards, retiring in 1894 with the rank of captain. He chaired several parliamentary committees. A friend of King Edward VII, he was sworn of the Privy Council in 1905.

== Personal life ==
He died unmarried in 1906 and was succeeded by his brother Alan.
