= Heneage Finch, 3rd Earl of Winchilsea =

English peer and diplomat

The Right Honourable The Earl of Winchilsea

English Ambassador to the Ottoman Empire
- In office 1660–1669
- Monarch: Charles II
- Preceded by: Sir Thomas Bendish
- Succeeded by: Sir Daniel Harvey

Personal details
- Born: Heneage Finch; 1628 England
- Died: 28 September 1689 (aged 60–61) England
- Spouses: Hon. Diana Willoughby (m. 1645; died 1648) Lady Mary Seymour (m. 1650; died 1673) Catherine Norcliffe (m. 1673; died 1678) Elizabeth Ayres (m. 1681)
- Children: 16, including: William Finch; Frances Finch; Heneage Finch; Thomas Finch; John Finch
- Parents: Thomas Finch; Cecille Wentworth
- Education: Queens' College, Cambridge

Arms of Finch: Argent, a chevron between three griffins passant sable

Heneage Finch, 3rd Earl of Winchilsea (c. 1628 – 28 September 1689) was an English peer and diplomat who served as the English ambassador to the Ottoman Empire from 1660 to 1669.

== Early life ==
Finch was the only surviving son of Thomas Finch, 2nd Earl of Winchilsea and the former Cecille Wentworth of Gosfield Hall, Essex.

His paternal grandparents were Sir Moyle Finch, 1st Baronet and Elizabeth Finch, suo jure 1st Countess of Winchilsea. His father inherited his grandfather's baronetcy from his uncle, Sir Theophilus Finch, 2nd Baronet, who died without issue in 1619. His maternal grandparents were John Wentworth, High Sheriff of Essex and Cecily Unton. His first cousin was Heneage Finch, 1st Earl of Nottingham.

He was educated at Queens' College, Cambridge.

== Career ==
On his return from Ottoman territory in June 1668, King Charles II remarked to Finch, "My Lord, you have not only built a town, but peopled it too". Winchilsea, in an obvious reference to Charles' own brood of natural children, replied that after all, he was the King's representative.

Lord Finch was appointed by his friend George Monck, 1st Duke of Albemarle a Governor of Dover Castle, and Lord Warden of the Cinque Ports in July 1660. He was also Lord Lieutenant of Kent and afterwards ambassador to the Ottoman Empire, and served in this capacity between 1668 and 1672.

Samuel Pepys first referred to him as the Lord Winchilsea.

King Charles II had landed at Kent on his way to London to secure the throne on 25 May 1660. The King arrived in Dover with 20 ships and frigates, the Lord General and his lifeguard were accompanied by the Earl of Winchelsea to the cheer of the crowding locals gathered upon the beach to witness a salute fired from the guns of Dover Castle. The King created him Baron FitzHerbert, of Eastwell in the County of Kent, on 26 June 1660.

== Personal life ==
Earl of Winchelsea's Estate Act 1660
- Act of Parliament
- Parliament of England
- Long title: An Act for the settling of the Priory of Watton, and other Lands belonging to the Earl of Winchilsea, in the County of Yorke, in the Hands of Trustees, for the Payment of Debts.
- Citation: 12 Cha. 2. c. 5 Pr.
- Territorial extent: England and Wales

Dates
- Royal assent: 13 September 1660
- Commencement: 25 April 1660 (Note: Start of session.)

Status: Current legislation

Finch was married four times and was the father of at least sixteen children. His first marriage was on 21 May 1645 to the Hon. Diana Willoughby, the eldest daughter of Francis Willoughby, 5th Baron Willoughby of Parham and Elizabeth Cecil (a younger daughter and co-heiress of Edward Cecil, 1st Viscount Wimbledon). She died and was buried at Eastwell on 27 March 1648.

His second marriage was in c. 1649 to Lady Mary Seymour (1637–1673), the second daughter of William Seymour, 2nd Duke of Somerset and Lady Frances Devereux eldest daughter of Robert Devereux, 2nd Earl of Essex). Before her death in 1673, their children included:

- William Finch, styled Viscount Maidstone (c. 1651–1672), who died at sea aboard the Royal Charles during the Battle of Solebay; he married Elizabeth Wyndham, a daughter of Thomas Wyndham, of Felbrigg Hall. Had issue, Charles Finch, 4th Earl of Winchilsea
- Lady Frances Finch (d. 1712), who married Thomas Thynne, 1st Viscount Weymouth.
- Heneage Finch, 5th Earl of Winchilsea (1657–1726), who married Anne Kingsmill, the daughter of Sir William Kingsmill.
- Hon. Thomas Finch (b. 1658), who was born before the family went to the Ottoman Empire.
- Elizabeth

His third marriage was to Catherine Norcliffe on 10 April 1673. The daughter of Sir Thomas Norcliffe and Hon. Dorothy Fairfax (fifth daughter of Thomas Fairfax, 1st Viscount Fairfax), she was twice a widow from her marriages to Christopher Lister, of Thornton, York, and Sir John Wentworth, of Elmshall, York. She died in c. 1678.

His final marriage was on 29 October 1681 to Elizabeth Ayres, only daughter and heiress of John Ayres of London. Before his death in 1689, they were the parents of:

- John Finch, 6th Earl of Winchilsea, who died unmarried and without issue.

Lord Winchilsea died on 28 September 1689. He was succeeded in his titles by his grandson Charles, as his eldest son William predeceased him.

=== Descendants ===
Through his daughter Frances, he was a grandfather of Henry Thynne (1675–1708), and Frances Thynne (who married Sir Robert Worsley, 4th Baronet).

== Notes ==
Diplomatic posts
Preceded by Sir Thomas Bendish, 2nd Baronet	British Ambassador to the Ottoman Empire; 1660–1669	Succeeded by Sir Daniel Harvey
Honorary titles
English Interregnum	Lord Lieutenant of Kent jointly with The Earl of Southampton 1662–1667; The Duke of Richmond 1668–1672; 1660–1688	Succeeded by The Lord Teynham
English Interregnum	Custos Rotulorum of Kent; 1660–1688	Succeeded by The Lord Teynham
Preceded by The Duke of Richmond	Vice-Admiral of Kent; 1672–1687	Succeeded by The Lord Teynham
Preceded by Robert Blake	Lord Warden of the Cinque Ports; 1660	Succeeded by The Duke of York and Albany
Preceded by The Duke of Somerset	Lord Lieutenant of Somerset; 1675–1683	Succeeded by The Duke of Somerset
Preceded by The Earl of Feversham	Lord Lieutenant and Custos Rotulorum of Kent; 1689	Succeeded by The Viscount Sydney
Peerage of England
Preceded by Thomas Finch	Earl of Winchilsea; 1639–1689	Succeeded by Charles Finch
New title	Baron FitzHerbert; 1660–1689	Succeeded by Charles Finch
