= Heneage Finch (speaker) =

English lawyer and politician (1580–1631)

Sir Heneage Finch
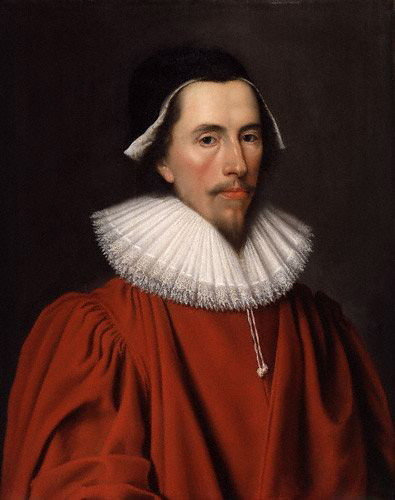
- Finch wearing the scarlet robes of a serjeant-at-law.

Speaker of the English House of Commons
- In office 1625–1626
- Preceded by: Sir Thomas Crewe
- Succeeded by: Sir John Finch

Member of Parliament for the City of London
- In office 1624–1626 Serving with Sir Thomas Myddelton; Sir Robert Bateman
- Preceded by: Robert Heath
- Succeeded by: Christopher Clitherow

Member of Parliament for West Looe
- In office 1621–1621 Serving with Christopher Harris
- Preceded by: John Harris; Sir Edward Lewkenor
- Succeeded by: George Mynn; James Bagg

Member of Parliament for Rye
- In office 1610–1614 Serving with John Young
- Preceded by: Thomas Hamon
- Succeeded by: Edward Hendon

Personal details
- Born: Heneage Finch; 15 December 1580
- Died: 5 December 1631 (aged 50)
- Spouses: Frances Bell (died 1627) Elizabeth Cardock Bennett (m. 1629)
- Relations: Sir Thomas Finch (grandfather); Sir Thomas Heneage (grandfather)
- Children: Earl of Nottingham, Viscountess Conway
- Parent(s): Sir Moyle Finch, 1st Baronet; Elizabeth Finch, 1st Countess of Winchilsea
- Education: Trinity College, Cambridge

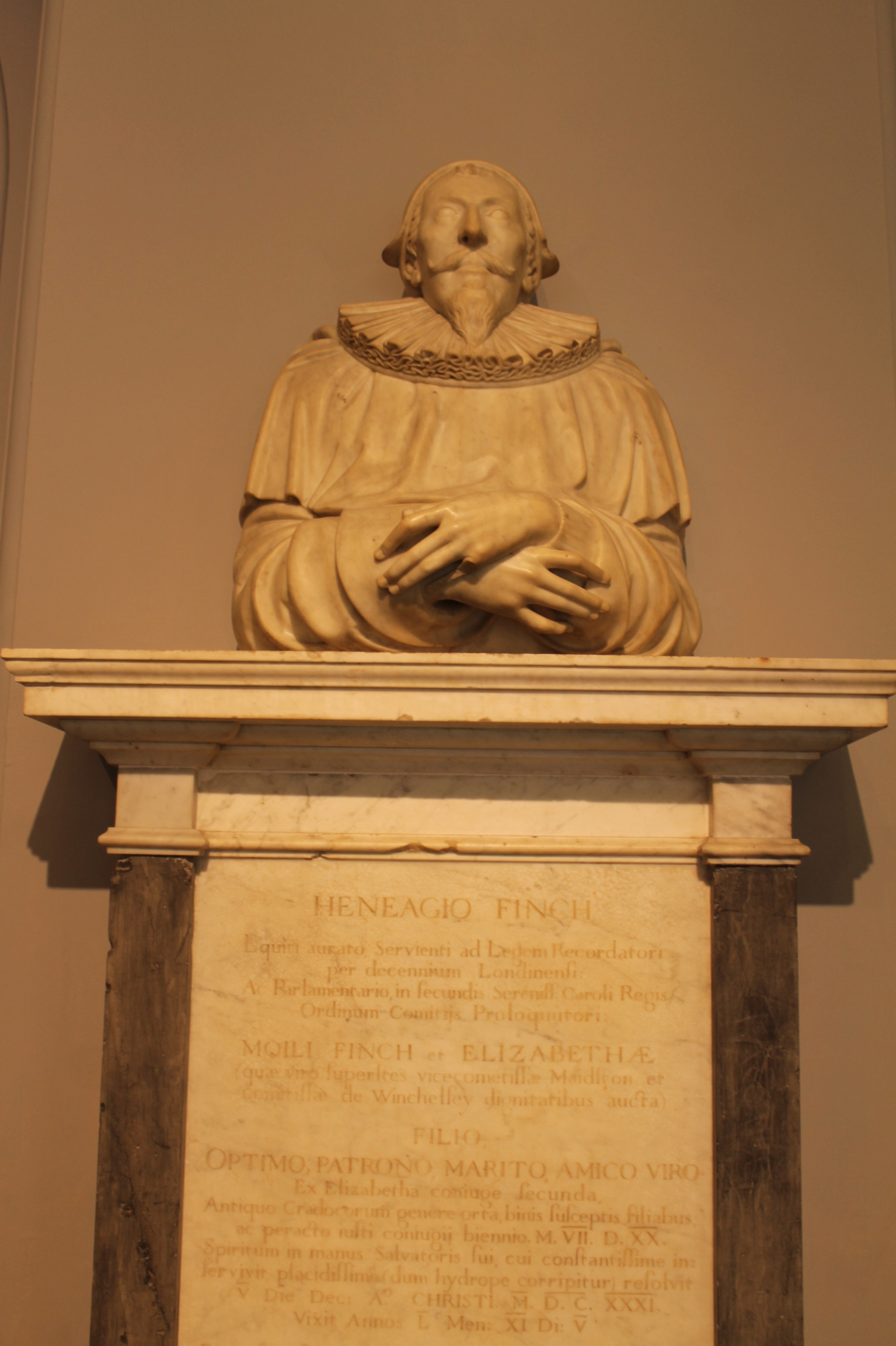
Grave monument to Heneage Finch by Nicholas Stone the Elder, now in Victoria and Albert Museum

Arms of Finch: Argent, a chevron between three griffins passant sable

Sir Heneage Finch (15 December 1580 – 5 December 1631) was an English lawyer, Member of Parliament, and politician who sat in the House of Commons at various times between 1607 and 1626. He was Speaker of the English House of Commons in 1626.

== Early life ==
Finch was born on 15 December 1580 at The Moat, his father's house near Canterbury. He was the fifth of seven sons of Sir Moyle Finch, 1st Baronet (c. 1550–1614) and the former Elizabeth Heneage (1556–1634). Among his siblings were Theophilus, Thomas and Francis Finch. His sister Anne was a noted writer who married Sir William Twysden and his sister Catherine married Sir John Wentworth, 1st Baronet of Gosfield.

He was the second to be named after his maternal grandfather, and godparent, Sir Thomas Heneage, the Chancellor of the Duchy of Lancaster and Vice-Chamberlain of the Household. His paternal grandfather was Sir Thomas Finch, the prominent military commander.

After his father's death in 1614, his mother, Lady Finch, was elevated to the peerage in her own right as Viscountess Winchilsea in 1623 and was further honoured when she was made Countess of Winchilsea in 1628. His mother died in 1634 and was succeeded by his elder brother Thomas, who had already succeeded their eldest brother Theophilus in the baronetcy.

He matriculated into Trinity College, Cambridge in about 1592, along with his elder brother Thomas, and was awarded B.A. in 1596.

== Career ==
He was admitted at Inner Temple in 1597 and called to the bar in 1606. In December 1607, Finch was elected a Member of Parliament for Rye in a by-election following the death of sitting Member, Thomas Hamon. His return was secured by his brother-in-law (Sir William Twysden), who used his influence to obtain a letter of recommendation from Henry Howard, 1st Earl of Northampton. Parliament was in recess, however, so Finch was unable to take his seat until February 1610. He was not returned to Parliament and in 1614 was replaced by Edward Hendon.

After he left Parliament, Finch entered the service of Prince Charles. Through Charles, Finch was nominated by the duchy of Cornwall for a parliamentary seat at Helston in December 1620. William Noy obtained the seat, however, the duchy found him an alternative place as MP for West Looe. A few weeks after Parliament began in 1621, Finch also succeeded as Recorder of London following the death of Robert Shute. He held this post until his death in 1631.

Between 1621 and 1624 Parliaments, Finch's legal career prospered. After serving as summer reader at the Inner Temple in 1622, he was knighted and made a serjeant. He was knighted on 22 June 1623 and became sergeant-at-law.

As Recorder of London, he enjoyed an almost automatic right to represent the City and was not dependent upon the duchy of Cornwall for a seat in Parliament. Therefore, he was elected for City of London in 1624, serving until the formal dissolution of Parliament. After Charles I became King, he was re-elected MP for the City of London in 1625 and in 1626 and was chosen to serve as Speaker of the House for his last term in 1626.

== Personal life ==
Finch was twice married. Finch was first married to Frances Bell (d. 1627) sometime after 1607. Frances was a daughter of Sir Edmond Bell of Beaupre Hall, Norfolk. Together, they were the parents of three sons and one daughter, including:

- Heneage Finch, 1st Earl of Nottingham (1620–1682), who married Elizabeth Harvey, a niece of Dr. William Harvey.
- Francis Finch (1623–1679), who married the widowed Elizabeth Parkhurst, daughter of Sir Robert Parkhurst.
- Elizabeth Finch (b. 1625), who married Edward Maddison (1594–1672), a son of Sir Ralph Maddison.
- John Finch (ambassador) (b. 1627)

On 16 April 1629, Sir Heneage was married to Elizabeth (née Cradock) Bennett (d. 1661). Elizabeth, a daughter of William Cradock, was the widow of Richard Bennett (d. 1628), a wealthy London merchant. Together, Lady Finch and Sir Heneage were the parents of several children, including:

- Frances Finch (b. 1630), who married Sir Clifford Clifton MP.
- Anne Finch (1631–1679), a philosopher in the tradition of the Cambridge Platonists and an influence on Leibniz who married Edward Conway, Viscount Conway (later 1st Earl of Conway).

After a lengthy illness, Sir Heneage died on 5 December 1631, at the age of 51, and was buried at Ravenstone, Buckinghamshire. His widow died in 1661.

Parliament of England
Preceded by John Harris; Sir Edward Lewkenor	Member of Parliament for West Looe; 1621; With: Christopher Harris	Succeeded by George Mynn; James Bagg
Political offices
Preceded by Robert Shute	Recorder of London; 1621-1631	Succeeded by Edward Littleton
Preceded by Sir Thomas Crewe	Speaker of the House of Commons; 1625-1626	Succeeded by Sir John Finch
