= Sir John Wentworth, 1st Baronet, of Gosfield =

English aristocrat

Sir John Wentworth, 1st Baronet (c. 1583 – October 1631), of Gosfield, Essex, was an English aristocrat.

== Early life ==
He was the eldest of two sons born of John Wentworth of Gosfield Hall, and the former Cicely Unton. His sister, Anne Wentworth, was the wife of Sir Edward Gostwick, 2nd Baronet. His father was High Sheriff of Essex and MP for Essex and for Wootton Bassett. After his father's death in 1613, his mother married Sir Edward Hoby before her death in 1618.

His paternal grandparents were Sir John Wentworth of Horkesley and Gosfield and Elizabeth Heydon (a daughter of Sir Christopher Heydon). His maternal grandparents were Sir Edward Unton and Lady Anne Seymour (the widow of John Dudley, 2nd Earl of Warwick and daughter of Edward Seymour, 1st Duke of Somerset). His uncle was Sir Henry Unton, English Ambassador to King Henry IV of France.

== Career ==
Escutcheon of the Wentworth baronets of Gosfield

Wentworth was created baronet Wentworth, of Gosfield, in the baronetage of England on 29 June 1611.

Upon his father's death in 1613, he was left "a splendid inheritance", but reportedly "ruined the family through extravagance."

== Personal life ==
Wentworth married Lady Catherine Finch, a daughter of Sir Moyle Finch, 1st Baronet and the former Elizabeth Heneage, suo jure Countess of Winchilsea. Among her siblings were Thomas Finch, 2nd Earl of Winchilsea (who married his sister, Cecily Wentworth), Hon. Sir Heneage Finch, Speaker of the House of Commons, and Hon. Francis Finch, MP for Eye. Together, they were the parents of two daughters:

- Cecily Wentworth (d. c. 1667), who married William Grey, 1st Baron Grey of Werke of Chillingham, in 1619.
- Lucy Wentworth (d. 1651), who married Thomas Wentworth, 1st Earl of Cleveland in 1638.

Sir John died in October 1631 at which time the baronetcy became extinct.

Baronetage of England
New creation	Baronet (of Gosfield); 1611–1631	Extinct
Preceded by Tracy baronets	Wentworth baronets of Gosfield; 29 June 1611	Succeeded by Belasyse baronets
