= Anne Twysden =

English writer

Lady Anne Twysden
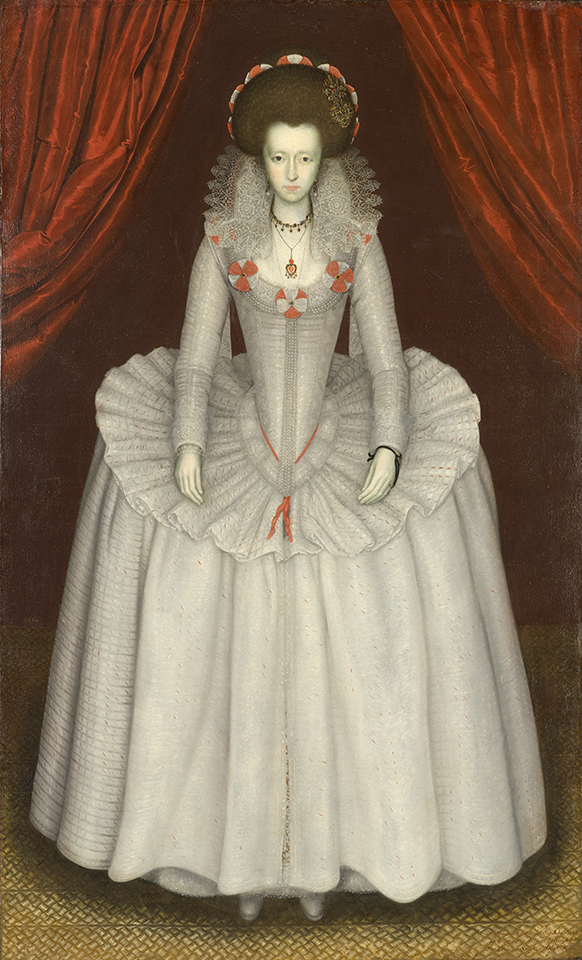
- Portrait of a Woman, probably Ann Finch, Lady Twysden, 1610
- Born: Anne Finch; 28 February 1574; London, Kingdom of England
- Died: 14 October 1638 (aged 64); Kent, Kingdom of England
- Spouse: Sir William Twysden, 1st Baronet (died 1629)
- Parent(s): Sir Moyle Finch, 1st Baronet; Elizabeth Finch, 1st Countess of Winchilsea
- Writing career
- Subject: Devotions

Lady Anne Twysden (née Finch; 28 February 1574 – 14 October 1638) was an English writer. She was the mother of several notable children but she is known principally for one book, the original of which is lost.

== Early life ==
Twysden was born in London in 1574 at Heneage House. Her parents were Sir Moyle Finch, 1st Baronet, and his wife Elizabeth Heneage who, suo jure, became the 1st Countess of Winchilsea. Among her siblings were Sir Theophilius Finch, 2nd Baronet, Thomas Finch, 2nd Earl of Winchilsea, Sir Heneage Finch (Speaker of the House of Commons), Francis Finch (MP for Eye), and Lady Catherine Finch (who married Sir John Wentworth, 1st Baronet, of Gosfield).

Anne learned four languages as a child at the court of Queen Elizabeth whilst in the care of her grandmother Elizabeth (born Heneage).

== Career ==
She had her own ladies-in-waiting which included the diarist Isabella Saunders and Jane Thomlinson; she married these off respectively to her son Roger in 1635 and to another son Thomas in 1639. She had two houses at East Peckham and Redcross Street in London. Details of her life are recorded in the extant diary of her daughter-in-law Isabella.

Her children had to persuade her to pay Charles I's Ship money which she objected to. She wrote a book of devotions that was edited and published by her son Roger. Her son's notes show that this was published after her death in 1638. The Twysden papers and two of her letters are held by the British Library. Twysden's original copy of her devotions was known to have existed until 1849 but it is now lost.

== Personal life ==
Anne married William Twysden who was made a baronet. Before his death in 1629, they had had five sons and two daughters, including:

- Sir Roger Twysden, 2nd Baronet (1597–1672), who married Isabella Saunders, the daughter of Sir Nicholas Saunders of Ewell.
- Elizabeth Twysden (1600–1655), who married Sir Hugh Cholmeley, 1st Baronet, in 1622.
- Sir Thomas Twisden, 1st Baronet (1602–1683), who married Jane Thomlinson, sister of the regicide Matthew Tomlinson.
- Anne Twysden (c. 1603–1670), who married Sir Christopher Yelverton, 1st Baronet.

Twysden died in Kent in 1638.
