= Sir Edward Gostwick, 2nd Baronet =

English aristocrat

Sir Edward Gostwick, 2nd Baronet (1588 – 29 September 1630) was an English aristocrat.

== Early life ==
Gostwick was born in 1588. He was the eldest surviving son and heir of Sir William Gostwick, 1st Baronet and the former Jane Owen. His father was created a baronet of Willington, in the County of Bedford, on 25 November 1611 by King James I.

His paternal grandparents were John Gostwick of Willington, Bedfordshire, and the former Elizabeth Petre (a daughter of Gertrude Tyrrell and Sir William Petre, Secretary of State to Kings Henry VIII and Edward VI and Queen Mary I). After his grandfather's death in c. 1582, Elizabeth married Edward Radclyffe, 6th Earl of Sussex. His mother was the only child and heiress of Elizabeth Radclyffe (a daughter or Sir Humphrey Radcliffe and sister to the 6th Earl of Sussex) and Henry Owen of Wotton, Surrey, a descendent of Owen Tudor.

== Career ==
On 3 May 1607, he was knighted at Whitehall in London. He succeeded as the 2nd Baronet Gostwick on 19 September 1615 following his father's death.

In 1626, he was appointed High Sheriff of Bedfordshire, serving until 1627. His father had previously held the post from 1595 to 1596.

== Personal life ==
On 2 April 1608, he married Anne Wentworth, a daughter of John Wentworth, MP for Essex and for Wootton Bassett, and the former Cicely Unton, at Gosfield Hall. Among her siblings were Sir John Wentworth, 1st Baronet (who married Lady Catherine Finch), and Cicely Wentworth (who married Thomas Finch, 2nd Earl of Winchilsea). Together, they were the parents of:

- Sir Edward Gostwick, 3rd Baronet (1619–1659), who married Mary Lytton, daughter of Sir William Lytton, in 1646.
- Thomas Gostwick, who married Elizabeth Dorislaus, daughter of Sir Isaac Dorislaus, Ambassador from Holland to Oliver Cromwell.
- William Gostwick, of Cople, who married Joane Wharton, daughter of Anthony Wharton of St Sepulchre, London.
- Elizabeth Gostwick, who married Francis Reading of Willington.
- Mary Gostwick, who married Nicolas Spencer, Esq. of Cople. After his death, she married Sir Clement Armiger of Cople.
- Frances Gostwick, who married Hon. Francis Mourdant, third son of Henry Mordaunt, 4th Baron Mordaunt.
- Anne Gostwick, who married Thorne, Esq.
- Jane Gostwick, who married Oliver, Esq. of St Neots, Huntingdonshire.

Sir Edward died on 29 September 1630 and was succeeded in the baronetcy by his son, Edward.

=== Descendants ===
Through his son Edward, he was a grandfather of Sir William Gostwick, 4th Baronet, who served as MP for Bedfordshire from 1698 to 1713.

Through his daughter Mary, he was a grandfather of Nicholas Spencer (1633–1689) and William Spencer of Cople, who married Lady Catherine Wentworth (a daughter of Thomas Wentworth, 1st Earl of Cleveland and, his second wife, Lucy Wentworth, a daughter of Sir John Wentworth, 1st Baronet, of Gosfield).

Baronetage of England
Preceded by William Gostwick	Baronet (of Willington); 1615–1630	Succeeded by Edward Gostwick
