= Thomas Finch, 2nd Earl of Winchilsea =

English peer and Member of Parliament

The Right Honourable The Earl of Winchilsea

Member of the England Parliament for Kent
- In office 1628–1629 Serving with Sir Dudley Digges
- Preceded by: Sir Edward Hales; Sir Edward Scott
- Succeeded by: Parliament suspended

Member of the England Parliament for Winchelsea
- In office 1621–1622 Serving with Edward Nicholas
- Preceded by: William Binge; Thomas Godfrey
- Succeeded by: Edward Nicholas; John Finch

Personal details
- Born: Thomas Finch; 13 June 1578 England
- Died: 4 November 1639 (aged 61) England
- Spouse: Cecille Wentworth (m. 1609)
- Children: Heneage Finch, 3rd Earl of Winchilsea
- Parents: Sir Moyle Finch, 1st Baronet; Elizabeth Heneage, 1st Countess of Winchilsea

Arms of Finch: Argent, a chevron between three griffins passant sable

Thomas Finch, 2nd Earl of Winchilsea (13 June 1578 – 4 November 1639) was an English peer and Member of Parliament.

== Early life ==
Finch was the third, but second surviving, son of Sir Moyle Finch, 1st Baronet and Elizabeth Heneage, 1st Countess of Winchilsea. Among his siblings were Sir Theophilius Finch, 2nd Baronet, Lady Anne Finch (who married Sir William Twysden, 1st Baronet), Hon. Sir Heneage Finch (Speaker of the House of Commons), Hon. Francis Finch (MP for Eye), and Lady Catherine Finch (who married Sir John Wentworth, 1st Baronet, of Gosfield).

His paternal grandparents were the former Catherine Moyle (a daughter of Sir Thomas Moyle). and Sir Thomas Finch and his uncle was Henry Finch (MP for Canterbury and St Albans). His maternal grandparents were the former Anne Poyntz (daughter of Sir Nicholas Poyntz) and Sir Thomas Heneage, who was Chancellor of the Duchy of Lancaster and Vice-Chamberlain of the Household in the latter years of the reign of Elizabeth I.

== Career ==
Finch represented the constituencies of Winchelsea from 1621 to 1622 and Kent from 1628 to 1629 as a Member of Parliament.

Upon the death of his elder brother Sir Theophilus Finch, 2nd Baronet in 1619, Finch inherited his father's baronetcy. Later, he inherited the earldom of Winchilsea from his mother Elizabeth Finch, 1st Countess of Winchilsea on her death in 1634.

== Personal life ==
In 1609, he married Cecille Wentworth, a daughter of John Wentworth of Gosfield Hall, High Sheriff of Essex, and Cecille Unton (dau. and eventual co-heiress of Sir Edward Unton). They had a son and three daughters, including:

- Heneage Finch, 3rd Earl of Winchilsea (c. 1627–1689), the British Ambassador to the Ottoman Empire who married Hon. Diana Willoughby, eldest daughter of Francis Willoughby, 5th Baron Willoughby in 1645. After her death in 1648, he married Lady Mary Seymour, second daughter of William Seymour, 2nd Duke of Somerset, in c. 1649. After her death in 1672, he married Catherine (née Norcliffe) Wentworth, widow of Christopher Lister and Sir John Wentworth (and daughter of Sir Thomas Norcliffe) in 1673. After her death in 1678, he married Elizabeth Ayres, only daughter and heiress of John Ayres, in 1681.
- Cecille Finch, who married Sir Erasmus Philipps, 3rd Baronet. After her death he married secondly to Catherine Darcy.

Lord Winchilsea died on 4 November 1639 and was succeeded in his titles by his only son, Heneage.

Parliament of England
| Preceded by William Binge; Thomas Godfrey | Member of Parliament for Winchelsea; 1621–1622; With: Edward Nicholas | Succeeded by Edward Nicholas; John Finch |
| Preceded by Sir Edward Hales; Sir Edward Scott | Member of Parliament for Kent; 1628–1629; With: Sir Dudley Digges | Parliament suspended until 1640 |
Peerage of England
| Preceded by Elizabeth Finch | Earl of Winchilsea; 1634–1639 | Succeeded by Heneage Finch |
Baronetage of England
| Preceded by Theophilus Finch | Baronet (of Eastwell, Kent) c. 1619–1639 | Succeeded by Heneage Finch |
