= Thomas Finch =

Thomas Finch may refer to:

- Thomas Finch, 2nd Earl of Winchilsea (1578–1639), English peer and member of parliament
- Thomas Finch (soldier) (died 1563), English nobleman, knight, soldier, and military commander
- Thomas Finch, List of ambassadors of the Kingdom of England to Russia
