= Daniel Harvey (diplomat) =

English merchant and politician (1631-1672)

Sir Daniel Harvey (10 November 1631 – August 1672) was an English merchant and diplomat who was the English Ambassador to the Ottoman Empire from 1668 to 1672.

== Life ==
Harvey was born in Croydon on 10 November 1631, the first surviving son of Daniel and Elizabeth Harvey. His grandfather Thomas was a wealthy merchant and former Mayor of Folkestone who had nine children, the eldest of whom was the anatomist William Harvey.

Harvey was educated at Pembroke College, Oxford and Caius College, Cambridge, graduating in 1647; (Note: Oxford became the Royalist capital during the First English Civil War 1642-46, which may explain the transfer to Cambridge.) Like his father, he was a member of the Turkey or Levant Company whose main source of profits was the lucrative trade in dried currants. (Note: Its full title being 'The Governor & Company of Merchants of England trading into the Levant Seas.') In 1651, he married Elizabeth, daughter of Edward Montagu, Baron Montagu of Boughton and shortly afterwards purchased an estate at Coombe, Surrey.

== Career ==
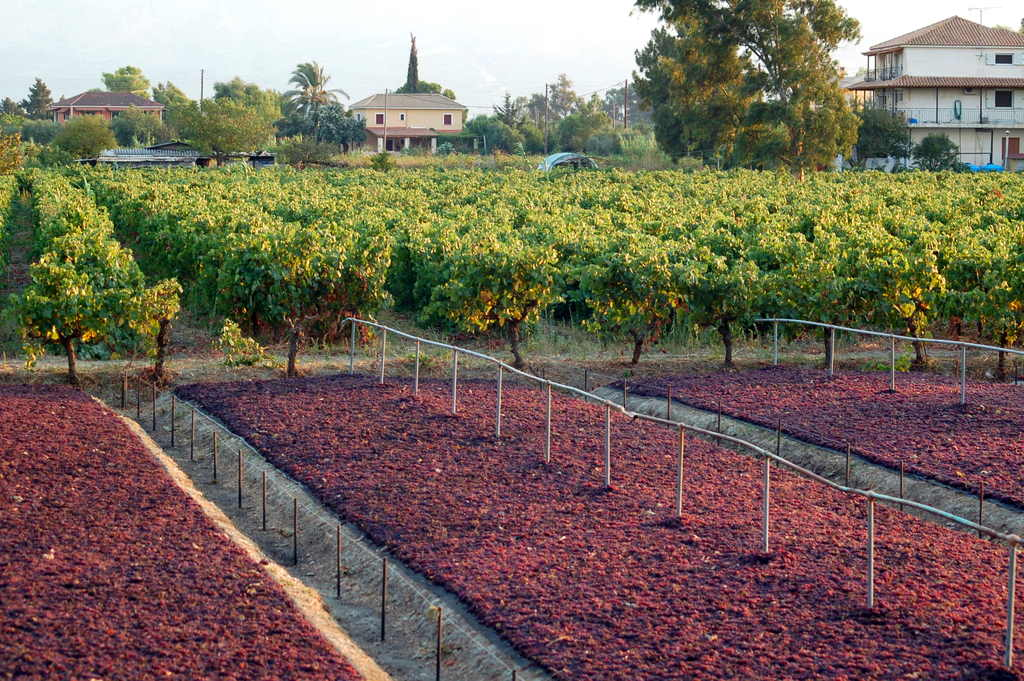
Sun-drying currants; the Levant Company was built on trade in this product

The Harveys were Royalist sympathisers during the Wars of the Three Kingdoms while the Montagus had been prominent supporters of Parliament. This made Daniel's marriage to Elizabeth an important connection and in 1654 he was made Sheriff of Surrey. The Montagus were also closely involved in the negotiations leading to the 1660 Restoration of Charles II. Harvey was elected Member of Parliament for Surrey in the Convention Parliament, knighted in May 1660 and appointed custodian of Richmond Park. Most importantly, Charles renewed the Levant Company's monopolistic charter in 1661.

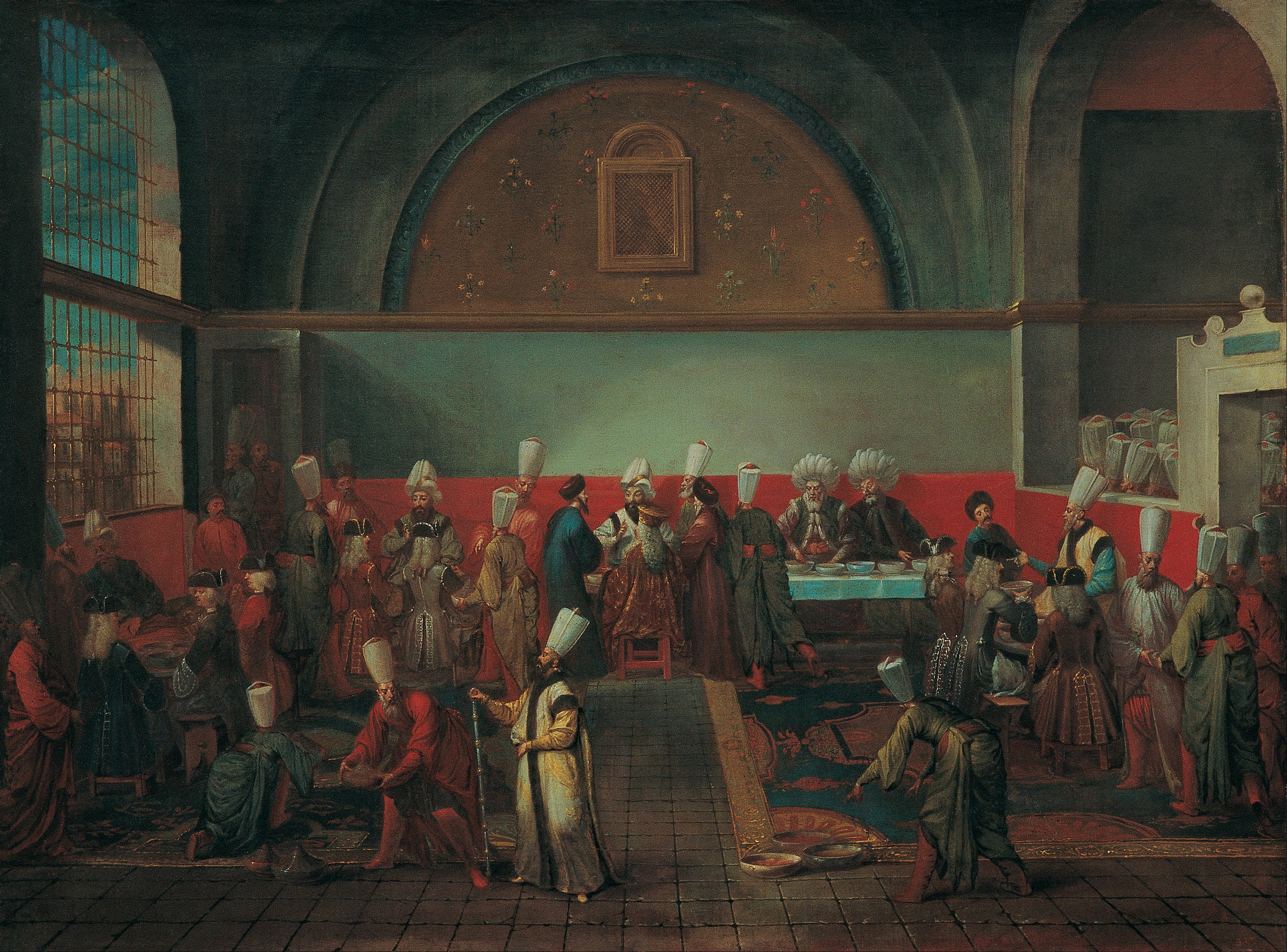
Ambassadors presenting their credentials at the Topkapı Palace in Constantinople

Harvey's wife Elizabeth was a significant figure in her own right and a renowned society hostess; she was a close friend of Charles' mistress Lady Castlemaine who stayed with her in 1667 during her quarrel with Charles, although they later fell out. One suggestion is Harvey's appointment as Ambassador to the Ottoman Empire was to remove an inconvenient husband.

The Levant Company charter of 1585 required it to maintain an agent in Constantinople, which looked after English trading privileges within the Ottoman Empire. Since the expenses associated with the Embassy were so high and increasingly covered more than just commercial dealings, the position of 'Agent' was later converted into Ambassador, normally held by a Levant Company member. Harvey was appointed in January 1668 and arrived in December accompanied by his secretary the playwright George Etherege. His predecessor was Heneage Finch, 3rd Earl of Winchilsea; Harvey's sister Elizabeth was married to his first cousin Heneage Finch, 1st Earl of Nottingham.

Harvey died in Constantinople on 26 August 1672 at the age of 40 and was later buried at Hempstead, Essex.

== Family ==
Daniel and Elizabeth had four children;

- Edward Harvey (30 March 1658 - 24 October 1736); Tory or Jacobite MP, arrested in 1722 for his role in the Atterbury Plot but released without charge;
- Lt-General Daniel Harvey (1664 – 6 September 1732); soldier and Whig MP who was Governor of Guernsey from 1714 to 1732;
- Edward Harvey (died young);
- Elizabeth Harvey; her marriage to Thomas Grey, 2nd Earl of Stamford ended in divorce amid accusations of adultery;

His sisters also married well-connected and influential husbands;

- Elizabeth Harvey (c. 1627 - 15 March 1676); married Heneage Finch, 1st Earl of Nottingham;
- Mary Harvey (September 1629 - 7 February 1704; married Sir Edward Dering, 3rd Baronet and a composer in her own right;
- Sarah Harvey (c. 1636 - 18 June 1715); married Richard Bulkeley, 3rd Viscount Bulkeley.

== Footnotes ==
Parliament of England
Preceded by Sir Richard Onslow; Arthur Onslow	Member of Parliament for Surrey; 1660; With: Francis Aungier	Succeeded by Adam Browne; Sir Edmund Bowyer
Diplomatic posts
Preceded by Heneage Finch, 3rd Earl of Winchilsea	English Ambassador to the Ottoman Empire; 1668–1672	Succeeded by Sir John Finch
