= Sir Theophilus Finch, 2nd Baronet =

English nobleman and politician

Sir Theophilus Finch, 2nd Baronet (2 October 1573 – c. 1619) was an English nobleman and politician.

== Early life ==
Finch was born on 2 October 1573. He was the eldest son of Sir Moyle Finch, 1st Baronet, and Elizabeth Finch, suo jure Countess of Winchilsea. Among his younger siblings were Thomas Finch (later the 2nd Earl of Winchilsea who married Cicely Wentworth), Sir Heneage Finch (later Speaker of the House of Commons), Francis Finch (a barrister who was an MP for Eye), and Lady Catherine Finch (who married Sir John Wentworth, 1st Baronet, of Gosfield).

His maternal grandparents were Anne Poyntz (a daughter of Sir Nicholas Poyntz) and Sir Thomas Heneage, who was Chancellor of the Duchy of Lancaster and Vice-Chamberlain of the Household in the latter years of the reign of Elizabeth I.

== Career ==
Finch matriculated at Magdalen College, Oxford in 1588, earning his B.A. in 1592. He was admitted to Gray's Inn in 1618.

Finch was knighted in 1599. He was returned as a Member of Parliament for Great Yarmouth in 1614.

== Personal life ==
On 16 July 1596, he married Agnes Heydon, only child of Sir Christopher Heydon of Baconsthorpe, and, his third wife, Agnes Crane (a daughter of Robert Crane, of Chilton).

Sir Theophilus died in c. 1619 and was buried in St. Paul's Cathedral near his maternal grandfather, Sir Thomas Heneage. His widow died the following year and was buried in St. Anne's Church, Blackfriars.

Parliament of England
| Preceded by Thomas Damet; John Wheeler | Member of Parliament for Great Yarmouth; 1614; With: George Hardware | Succeeded by Benjamin Cooper; Edward Owner |
Baronetage of England
| Preceded by Moyle Finch | Baronet (of Eastwell, Kent); 1614–c. 1619 | Succeeded by Thomas Finch |
