= Anne Finch =

Anne Finch may refer to:

- Anne Conway, Viscountess Conway née Finch, (1631 – 1679), English philosopher
- Anne Finch, Countess of Winchilsea (1661 – 1720), countess and poet
- Anne Finch, Countess of Nottingham and Winchilsea (1668–1743), relation by marriage of the above
- Anne Vavasour (c. 1560 – c. 1650), married name Finch, Lady of the Bedchamber to Queen Elizabeth I of England
- Anne Twysden (1574 – 1638) (born Anne Finch), British writer
