= Custos Rotulorum of Kent =

This is a list of people who have served as Custos Rotulorum of Kent.

- Sir John Baker bef. 1544–1558
- Thomas Wotton bef. 1562–1587
- Sir Henry Cobham 1587–1592
- Sir Edward Hoby bef. 1594–1617
- Ludovic Stewart, 2nd Duke of Lennox 1617–1624
- Philip Herbert, 4th Earl of Pembroke 1624–1642
- Robert Sidney, 2nd Earl of Leicester 1642–1646
- Interregnum
- Heneage Finch, 3rd Earl of Winchilsea 1660–1688
- Christopher Roper, 5th Baron Teynham 1688–1689
- Heneage Finch, 3rd Earl of Winchilsea 1689
- Henry Sidney, 1st Earl of Romney 1689–1704
- Charles Finch, 4th Earl of Winchilsea 1704–1705
- Lewis Watson, 1st Earl of Rockingham 1705–1724
- Lionel Sackville, 1st Duke of Dorset 1724–1765

For later custodes rotulorum, see Lord Lieutenant of Kent.
