= John Wentworth (died 1613) =

Sixteenth and seventeenth century English member of Parliament

John Wentworth (1564–1613), of Gosfield Hall, Essex, was an English politician.

== Early life ==
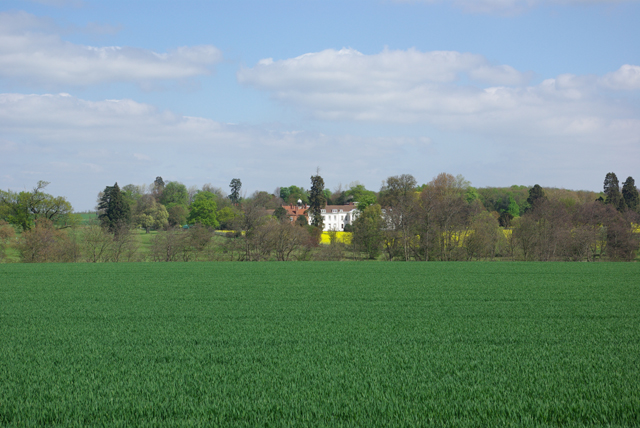
Gosfield Hall, the Wentworth family home for several generations

He was the only son of Sir John Wentworth of Little Horkesley and Gosfield Hall, Essex, and the former Elizabeth Heydon (d. c. 1573) (a daughter of Sir Christopher Heydon and his first wife Anne Drury). His only sister, also named Elizabeth Wentworth (d. 1627), married firstly Christopher St Lawrence, 10th Baron Howth, which ended in a legal separation in about 1605, before she married Sir Robert Newcomen, 1st Baronet.

In 1581, his father inherited Gosfield Hall, Essex from his relative Ann, Lady Maltravers.

== Career ==
He succeeded to his father's estates in 1588 before being appointed High Sheriff of Essex in 1592, and serving until 1593. He was a Member of the Parliament of England for Essex in 1597 and for Wootton Bassett, presumably due to the influence of his wife's uncle, the Earl of Hertford, in 1601. He leaves little trace on the records of Parliament, nor does he seem to have been active in county affairs. On the other hand, he built up the family estates into "a splendid inheritance", despite the very heavy debts run up by his father-in-law, who had left £23,000 in debts, which involved him in much trouble and litigation over his wife's inheritance. He was also noted for his charity to the poor.

== Personal life ==
He had married Cicely Upton, the daughter of Sir Edward Unton and Lady Anne Seymour (daughter of Edward Seymour, 1st Duke of Somerset). She was also a sister of Sir Henry Unton. Together, they were the parents of at least one son and four daughters, including:

- Sir John Wentworth, 1st Baronet (c. 1583–1631), who married Lady Catherine Finch, a daughter of Sir Moyle Finch, 1st Baronet and the former Elizabeth Heneage, suo jure Countess of Winchilsea.
- William Wentworth (1588–1604), who died unmarried.
- Elizabeth Wentworth (b. c. 1589), who married Charles Garneys, son of Nicholas Garneys.
- Diana Wentworth (b. c. 1590), who married Lewis Bowes.
- Anne Wentworth (1591–1633), who married Sir Edward Gostwick, 2nd Baronet, in 1608.
- Cicely Wentworth (1593–1642), who married Thomas Finch, 2nd Earl of Winchilsea (brother to Lady Catherine Finch), in 1609.

He died in 1613 and was buried at Gosfield. He was succeeded in the family estates, that "splendid inheritance", by his eldest son Sir John Wentworth, 1st Baronet, who dissipated the wealth accumulated by his father. His widow remarried the soldier, diplomat and scholar Sir Edward Hoby. She died in 1618.

=== Descendants ===
Through his daughter Cicely, he was a grandfather of four grandchildren, including Heneage Finch, 3rd Earl of Winchilsea.

Parliament of England
Preceded by Sir Thomas Heneage; Richard Warren	Member of Parliament for Essex; 1593–1597; With: William Petre	Succeeded by Henry Maynard; Sir Francis Barrington
Preceded by Henry Dacre; John Lowe	Member of Parliament for Wootton Bassett; 1601–1604; With: John Rice	Succeeded by Henry Martyn; Alexander Tutt
Honorary titles
Preceded by Richard Warren	High Sheriff of Essex; 1593–1594	Succeeded by Humphrey Mildmay
