= John Finch, 6th Earl of Winchilsea =

English peer

The Right Honourable; The Earl of Winchilsea
- Earl of Winchilsea
- Tenure: 1726–1729
- Predecessor: Heneage Finch
- Successor: Daniel Finch
- Other titles: Viscount Maidstone; Baron FitzHerbert; Baronet of Eastwell, Kent
- Born: John Finch; 24 February 1682; Eastwell, Kent, England
- Died: 9 September 1729 (aged 47)
- Buried: Westminster Abbey, London, England
- Parents: Heneage Finch, 3rd Earl of Winchilsea; Elizabeth Ayres

Arms of Finch: Argent, a chevron between three griffins passant sable

John Finch, 6th Earl of Winchilsea (24 February 1682/83 – 9 September 1729) was an English peer.

He was a son of Heneage Finch, 3rd Earl of Winchilsea and his fourth wife Elizabeth Ayres (who died 10 April 1745). He was christened on 6 March 1683 in Eastwell, Kent, England

After the death of his older, childless half-brother Heneage Finch, 5th Earl of Winchilsea in 1726 John Finch succeeded him.

He died unmarried too on 9 September 1729 and was buried in Westminster Abbey.

Peerage of England
Preceded by Heneage Finch	Earl of Winchilsea; 1726–1729	Succeeded by Daniel Finch
Preceded by Heneage Finch	Baron FitzHerbert; 1726–1729	Extinct
