= Elizabeth Finch, 1st Countess of Winchilsea =

English peeress

The Right Honourable; The Countess of Winchilsea
- Countess of Winchilsea
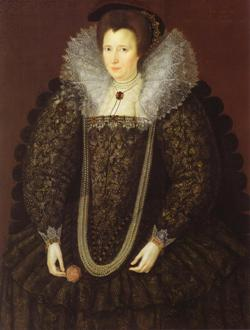
- Portrait of Finch, by Marcus Gheeraerts the Younger, c. 1600, formerly among the Lenthall pictures.
- Successor: Thomas Finch, 2nd Earl of Winchilsea
- Born: Elizabeth Heneage; 9 July 1556; England
- Died: 23 March 1634 (aged 77); England
- Spouse: Sir Moyle Finch, 1st Baronet (m. 1572; died 1614)
- Issue: Theophilius Finch; Anne Finch; Thomas Finch; Heneage Finch; Francis Finch; Catherine Finch
- Parents: Sir Thomas Heneage; Anne Poyntz

Elizabeth Finch, née Heneage, 1st Countess of Winchilsea (9 July 1556 – 23 March 1634) was an English peeress.

== Early life ==
Elizabeth was born on 9 July 1556. She was the daughter and heiress of Sir Thomas Heneage, who was Chancellor of the Duchy of Lancaster and Vice-Chamberlain of the Household in the latter years of the reign of Elizabeth I. Her mother was the former Anne Poyntz, daughter of Sir Nicholas Poyntz and Joan (née Berkeley) Poyntz.

After her mother's death in 1593, her father remarried to Mary Browne, Countess of Southampton on 2 May 1594.

== Personal life ==
At sixteen years old, she was married to Moyle Finch (c. 1550–1614) on 14 November 1572. Moyle was the eldest surviving son of Sir Thomas Finch and the brother of Henry Finch. Together, they were the parents of eleven children, including:

- Theophilius Finch (1573–1619), later 2nd Baronet.
- Lady Anne Finch (1574–1638), who married Sir William Twysden, 1st Baronet.
- Heneage Finch (b. 1576), who died young.
- Thomas Finch, 2nd Earl of Winchilsea (1578–1639) who married Cicely Wentworth, daughter of John Wentworth, MP.
- Hon. Sir Heneage Finch (1580–1631), later Speaker of the House of Commons.
- Hon. Francis Finch (b. c. 1585), a barrister.
- Lady Catherine Finch, who married Sir John Wentworth, 1st Baronet, of Gosfield (c. 1583–1631).

Soon after their marriage, her husband became a politician, serving as a Member of Parliament for Weymouth between 1576 and 1584, for Kent in 1593 and for Winchelsea in 1601. He served as High Sheriff of Kent in 1596 and 1605. He was knighted in 1584, and awarded a baronetcy in 1611.

When James VI and I came to England at the Union of the Crowns in 1603, "Lady Finch" and other courtiers with the young Lady Anne Clifford gathered at Northaw and went to see the new king at Theobalds.

After Moyle Finch died in 1614, Elizabeth and her sons made considerable efforts to have the family's status elevated and almost nine years later, James I created her Viscountess Maidstone, with a remainder to her heirs male. In 1628, she was further elevated by Charles I as Countess of Winchilsea. On her death in 1634, her titles passed to her eldest surviving son, Sir Thomas (who had already inherited his elder brother's baronetcy in 1619).

Elizabeth and Sir Moyle are depicted in repose in a monument commemorating members of the Finch family, sculpted by Nicolas Stone c. 1630. The piece was created after Sir Moyle's death during Elizabeth's lifetime, and is now displayed at the Victoria and Albert Museum, London. It was originally in the church of St Mary, Eastwell, Kent, which became a ruin in the 1950s and is now owned by the Friends of Friendless Churches.

=== Descendants ===
Through her son Heaneage, she was a grandmother of seven boys and four girls. One of her grandsons was Heneage Finch, 1st Earl of Nottingham. His daughter Anne married Edward Conway, Viscount Conway, and was a philosopher in the tradition of the Cambridge Platonists and an influence on Leibniz. His daughter Frances married Sir Clifford Clifton, MP.

== Sources ==
- Burke's Peerage & Gentry
- "Heneage, Elizabeth [married name Elizabeth Finch, countess of Winchilsea]". Oxford Dictionary of National Biography (online ed.). Oxford University Press. doi:10.1093/odnb/9780198614128.013.112769. (Subscription, Wikipedia Library access or UK public library membership required.)

Peerage of England
New creation	Countess of Winchilsea; 1628 – 1634	Succeeded by Thomas Finch
New creation	Viscountess Maidstone; 1623 – 1634	Succeeded by Thomas Finch
