= Matthieu Coignet =

Matthieu Coignet (c. 1514 – 1586) was a French lawyer, ambassador, landowner, and author. Thanks to an early English translation, some English-language sources give his name as Martyn Cognet.

== Life ==
By 1549 Coignet was an advocate in the Parlement of Paris, a high appellate court. He was also Master of Requests to the French Queen, Catherine de' Medici, and in 1559 was appointed as procurator general of the Parlement of Savoy. On 22 February 1580 he was noted as a member of the Conseil du Roi, a sometime ambassador to Schwyz and the Grisons, Master of Requests, and lord (seigneur) of La Tuillerie-les-Dampmartin and of part of Bregi-en-Mulcian.

He died in 1586, aged 72.

== Publications ==
La Croix du Maine notes in his Les Bibliotheques françoises that by 1583 Coignet had published two books, Instruction aux Princes de garder la foi promise and La Philosophie Chretienne. His work was translated into English by Edward Hoby and published in 1586 under the title Politique discourses on trueth and lying, with an introduction by Thomas Digges. Hoby gives the original author's name as "Sir Martyn Cognet".
