= Sir Moyle Finch, 1st Baronet =

English politician

Sir Moyle Finch, Bt JP
- Arms of Finch: Argent, a chevron between three griffins passant sable

Member of Parliament for Winchelsea
- In office 1601–1601 Serving with Hugh Beeston
- Preceded by: Ralph Ewens; Thomas Colepeper
- Succeeded by: Adam White; Thomas Unton

Member of Parliament for Kent
- In office 1593–1593 Serving with Sir Edward Hoby
- Preceded by: Henry Brooke; Sir Henry Brooke
- Succeeded by: Sir Robert Sidney; Sir William Brooke

Member of Parliament for Weymouth and Melcombe Regis
- In office 1576–1584 Serving with Laurence Thompson, John Wolley, Thomas Hanham
- Preceded by: Laurence Thompson; John Wolley; Richard Bedell; Thomas Hanham
- Succeeded by: Laurence Thompson; Francis Bacon; George Grenville; Edward Penruddock

Personal details
- Born: c. 1550
- Died: 18 December 1614 (aged 63–64)
- Spouse: Elizabeth Heneage (m. 1573)
- Children: Sir Theophilus Finch, 2nd Baronet; Lady Anne Twysden; Thomas Finch, 2nd Earl of Winchilsea; Sir Heneage Finch; Hon. Francis Finch; Lady Catherine Wentworth
- Parent(s): Sir Thomas Finch; Catherine Moyle

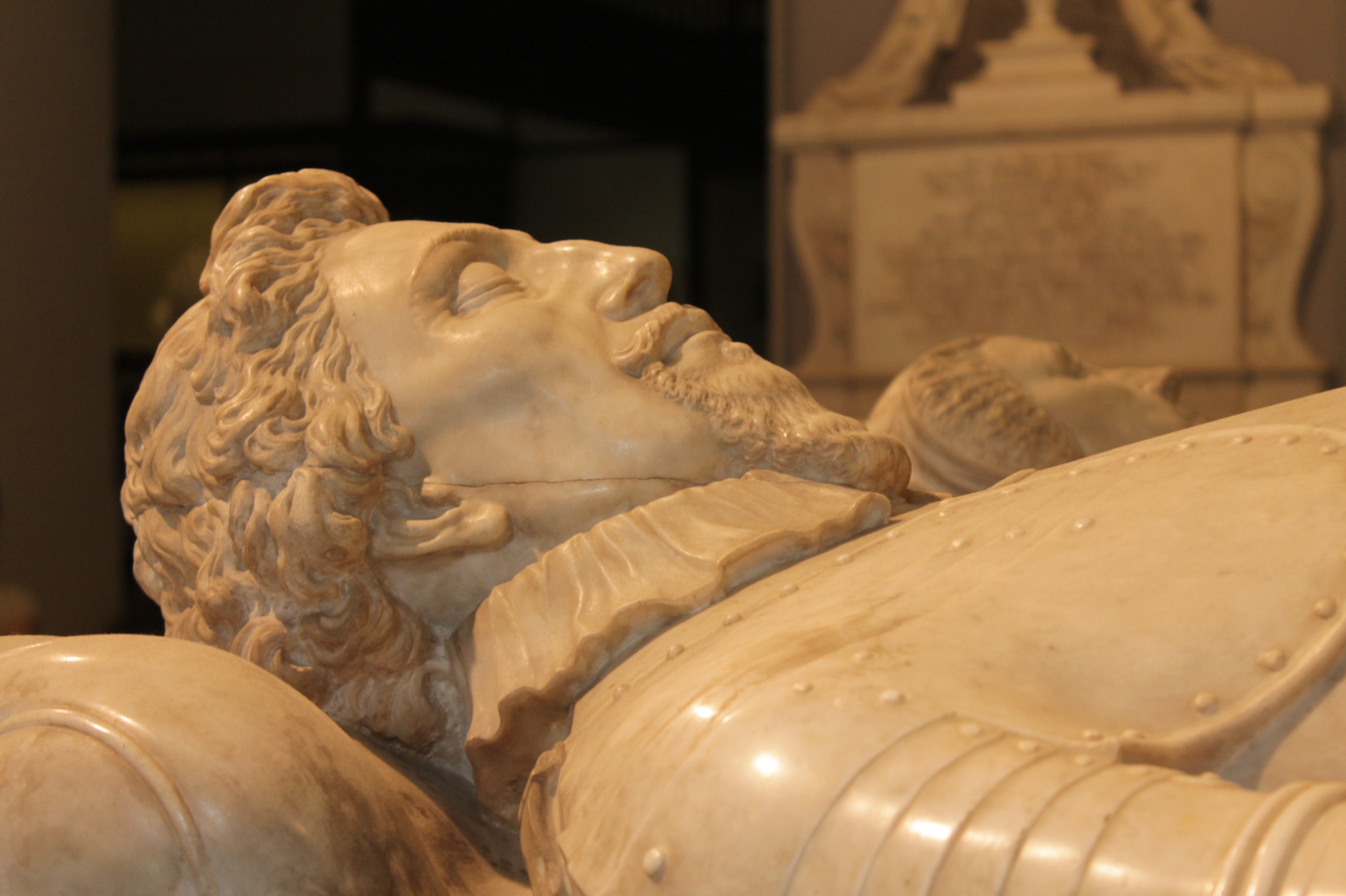
Sir Moyle Finch, close up of grave (now in V & A)

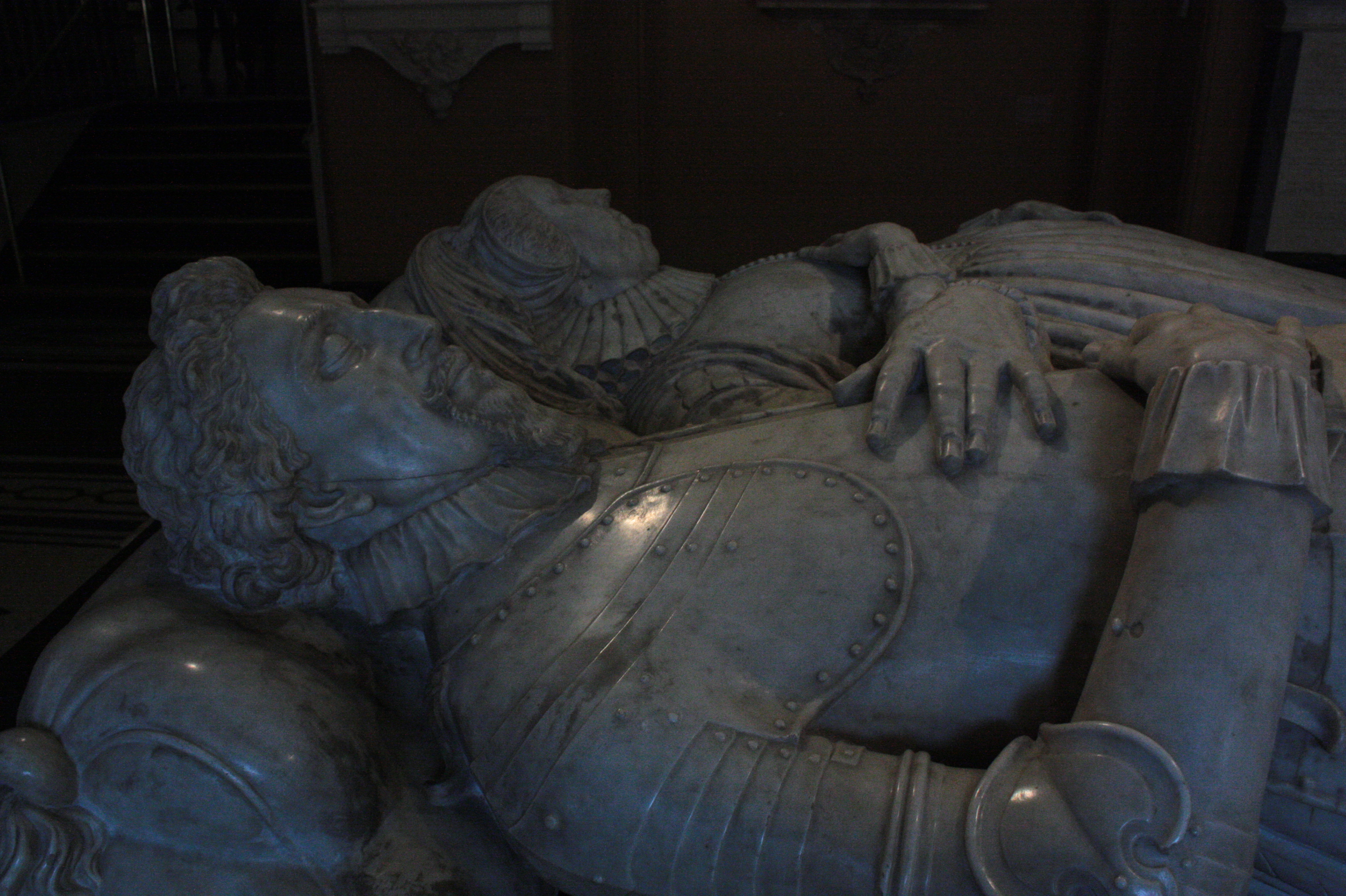
Sir Moyle Finch's tomb, by Nicholas Stone the Elder, now in Victoria and Albert Museum

Sir Moyle Finch, 1st Baronet JP (c. 1550 – 18 December 1614) was an English politician, knight, sheriff, and MP.

== Early life ==
Finch was the second, but eldest surviving son, of Sir Thomas Finch of Eastwell, Kent, and the former Catherine Moyle. Among his siblings was brother Henry Finch (MP for Canterbury and St Albans), and sister Jane Finch (who married George Wyatt of Allington Castle).

His paternal grandparents were Sir William Finch, who was knighted for his services at the siege of Therouanne, and, his first wife, Elizabeth (née Cromer) Lovelace (a daughter of Sir James Cromer of Tunstall, Kent, and widow of Sir Richard Lovelace). His maternal grandparents were Sir Thomas Moyle and the former Katherine Jordeyne (a daughters of Edward Jordeyne, a leading goldsmith at Cheapside with a manor at Raynham).

Finch was admitted of Gray's Inn in 1568.

== Career ==
Finch first entered Parliament at a by-election for Weymouth and Melcombe Regis, through the influence of the 2nd Earl of Bedford, who had campaigned with his father at St. Quentin in 1557 (during the Italian War), sitting between 1576 and 1584. He later represented Kent in 1593 (the same year he was elected knight of the shire for Kent) and for Winchelsea in 1601. He served as High Sheriff of Kent in 1596 and 1605.

He was knighted in 1585 and he was created a Baronet, of Eastwell in the County of Kent, in 1611.

== Personal life ==
In 1573, Finch married Elizabeth Heneage, daughter and heiress of Sir Thomas Heneage. They had a daughter Anne who was a writer: she married Sir William Twysden, 1st Baronet.

- Sir Theophilius Finch, 2nd Baronet (1573–1619), who married Agnes Heydon, only child of Sir Christopher Heydon of Baconsthorpe.
- Lady Anne Finch (1574–1638), who married Sir William Twysden, 1st Baronet.
- Heneage Finch (born 1576), who died young.
- Thomas Finch, 2nd Earl of Winchilsea (1578–1639), who married Cicely Wentworth, daughter of John Wentworth, MP.
- Hon. Sir Heneage Finch (1580–1631), Speaker of the House of Commons who married Frances Bell, a daughter of Sir Edmond Bell of Beaupre Hall. After her death, he married Elizabeth (née Cradock) Bennett, a daughter of William Cradock and the widow of Richard Bennett.
- Hon. Francis Finch (b. c. 1585), a barrister and MP for Eye.
- Lady Catherine Finch, who married Sir John Wentworth, 1st Baronet, of Gosfield.

He died in December 1614 and was succeeded by his eldest son, Theophilus. Lady Finch was elevated to the peerage in her own right as Viscountess Winchilsea in 1623 and was further honoured when she was made Countess of Winchilsea in 1628. She died in 1634 and was succeeded by her third son, Thomas, who had already succeeded his elder brother in the baronetcy. Their fourth son Sir Heneage Finch became Speaker of the House of Commons and was the father of Heneage Finch, 1st Earl of Nottingham.

Baronetage of England
New creation	Baronet (of Eastwell); 1611–1614	Succeeded by Theophilus Finch
