= Charles Finch, 4th Earl of Winchilsea =

British peer and Member of Parliament

The Right Honourable The Earl of Winchilsea PC

First Lord of Trade
- In office 1711–1712
- Monarch: Anne
- Preceded by: The Earl of Stamford
- Succeeded by: The Lord Guilford

Ambassador Extraordinary to Hanover
- In office 1702–1703
- Preceded by: James Cressett
- Succeeded by: Edmund Poley

Personal details
- Born: Charles Finch; 26 September 1672 England
- Died: 16 August 1712 (aged 39) England
- Parents: William Finch; Elizabeth Wyndham

Arms of Finch: Argent, a chevron between three griffins passant sable

Charles Finch, 4th Earl of Winchilsea PC (26 September 1672 – 16 August 1712) was a British peer and Member of Parliament, styled Viscount Maidstone until 1689. He was the son of William Finch, Lord Maidstone (son of Heneage Finch, 3rd Earl of Winchilsea) and Elizabeth Wyndham. His father had died before he was born and Finch was raised in Eastwell, Kent by his mother and other relatives.

From 1702 to 1703 he served as Ambassador Extraordinary to Hanover. In 1702, he was appointed Vice-Admiral of Kent, and in 1704, Lord Lieutenant and Custos Rotulorum of that county. He was dismissed from all his Kentish offices in 1705. In 1711, he was sworn of the Privy Council and was appointed First Lord of Trade. Upon his death in 1712, he was succeeded as Earl of Winchilsea by his uncle, Heneage Finch.

Political offices
Preceded by The Earl of Stamford	First Lord of Trade; 1711–1712	Succeeded by The Lord Guilford
Honorary titles
Preceded by The Earl of Romney	Lord Lieutenant and Custos Rotulorum of Kent; 1704–1705	Succeeded by The Lord Rockingham
Preceded by The Earl of Romney	Vice-Admiral of Kent; 1702–1705	Succeeded by The Lord Rockingham
Peerage of England
Preceded by Heneage Finch	Earl of Winchilsea; 1689–1712	Succeeded by Heneage Finch
