= Heneage Finch, 1st Earl of Nottingham =

English politician

The Right Honourable The Earl of Nottingham PC
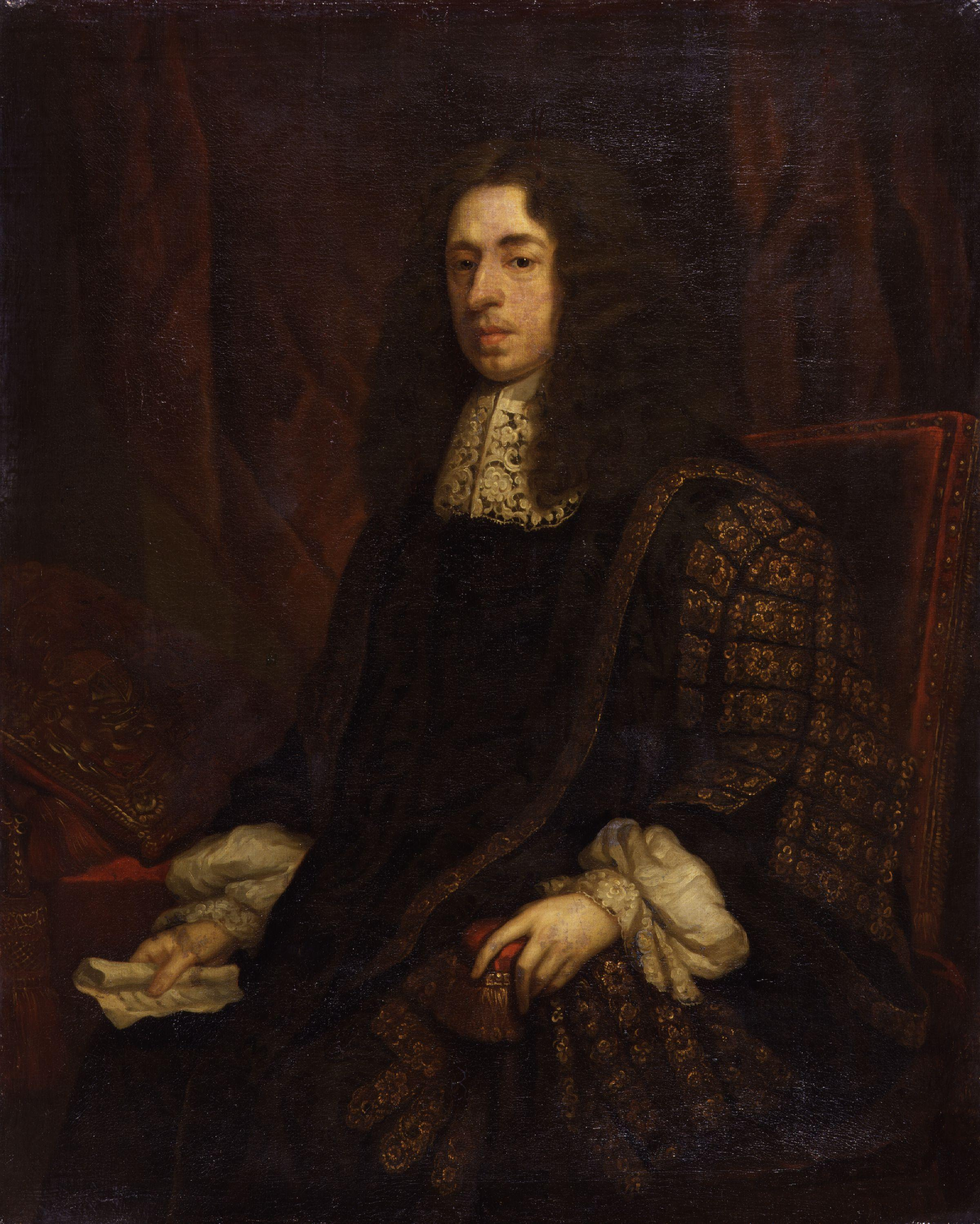
- Portrait after Sir Godfrey Kneller, c. 1680

Lord Chancellor
- In office 1675–1682
- Preceded by: The Earl of Shaftesbury
- Succeeded by: Sir Francis North

Lord Keeper
- In office 1673–1675
- Preceded by: The Earl of Shaftesbury
- Succeeded by: Sir Francis North

Attorney General
- In office 1670–1673
- Preceded by: Sir Geoffrey Palmer, Bt
- Succeeded by: Sir Francis North

Solicitor General
- In office 1660–1670
- Preceded by: William Ellis
- Succeeded by: Sir Edward Turnour

Member of Parliament for Oxford University
- In office 1661–1674 Serving with Laurence Hyde
- Preceded by: Thomas Clayton; John Mylles
- Succeeded by: Laurence Hyde; Thomas Thynne

Member of Parliament for Canterbury
- In office 1660–1660 Serving with Sir Anthony Aucher
- Preceded by: Sir Edward Master; John Nutt
- Succeeded by: Francis Lovelace; Sir Edward Master

Personal details
- Born: Heneage Finch; 23 December 1620 Eastwell, Kent
- Died: 18 December 1682 (aged 61) Great Queen Street, London
- Spouse: Elizabeth Harvey (after 1646)
- Parent(s): Sir Heneage Finch; Frances Bell Finch
- Education: Christ Church, Oxford

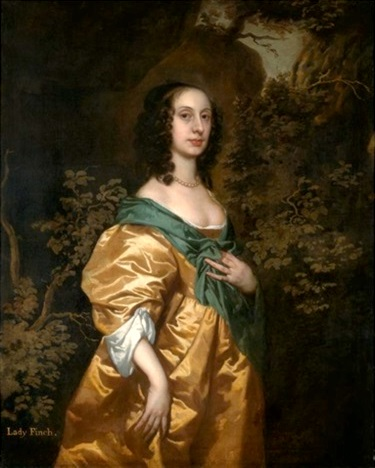
Elizabeth Harvey, later Baroness Finch or "Lady Finch"(1627-1676) by Peter Lely. C. 1650

Heneage Finch, 1st Earl of Nottingham, PC (23 December 1620 – 18 December 1682), Lord Chancellor of England, was descended from the old family of Finch, many of whose members had attained high legal eminence, and was the eldest son of Sir Heneage Finch, Recorder of London, by his first wife Frances Bell, daughter of Sir Edmond Bell of Beaupre Hall, Norfolk.

== Early career ==
He was the son of Sir Heneage Finch, younger son of Sir Moyle Finch, 1st Baronet and Elizabeth Finch, later 1st Countess of Winchilsea (née Heneage). In the register of Oxford University, he is entered as born in Kent probably at the Finch ancestral seat of Eastwell Park in Kent.

He was educated at Westminster. He then transferred to Christ Church, Oxford as a gentleman commoner in Lent Term, 1635. At Oxford, 'he remained between two and three years, reading very diligently' but did not graduate on account of his father's death. After a short hiatus, he resolved to enter the profession of law, and became a member of the Inner Temple in 1638, 'with the fixed resolve of mastering the science of the law'. In his time at the Inn, he was said to have always applied the maxim 'a law student ought to read all the morning and to talk all the afternoon'. He regularly attended disputations and soon became very eloquent, being said to have had 'fluency of speech and readiness of reply'. He was also a note-taker, having attended cases on a regular basis not only as a student, but also into his practice. He was called to the Bar on 30 January 1645, and soon obtained a lucrative practice.

== Career ==
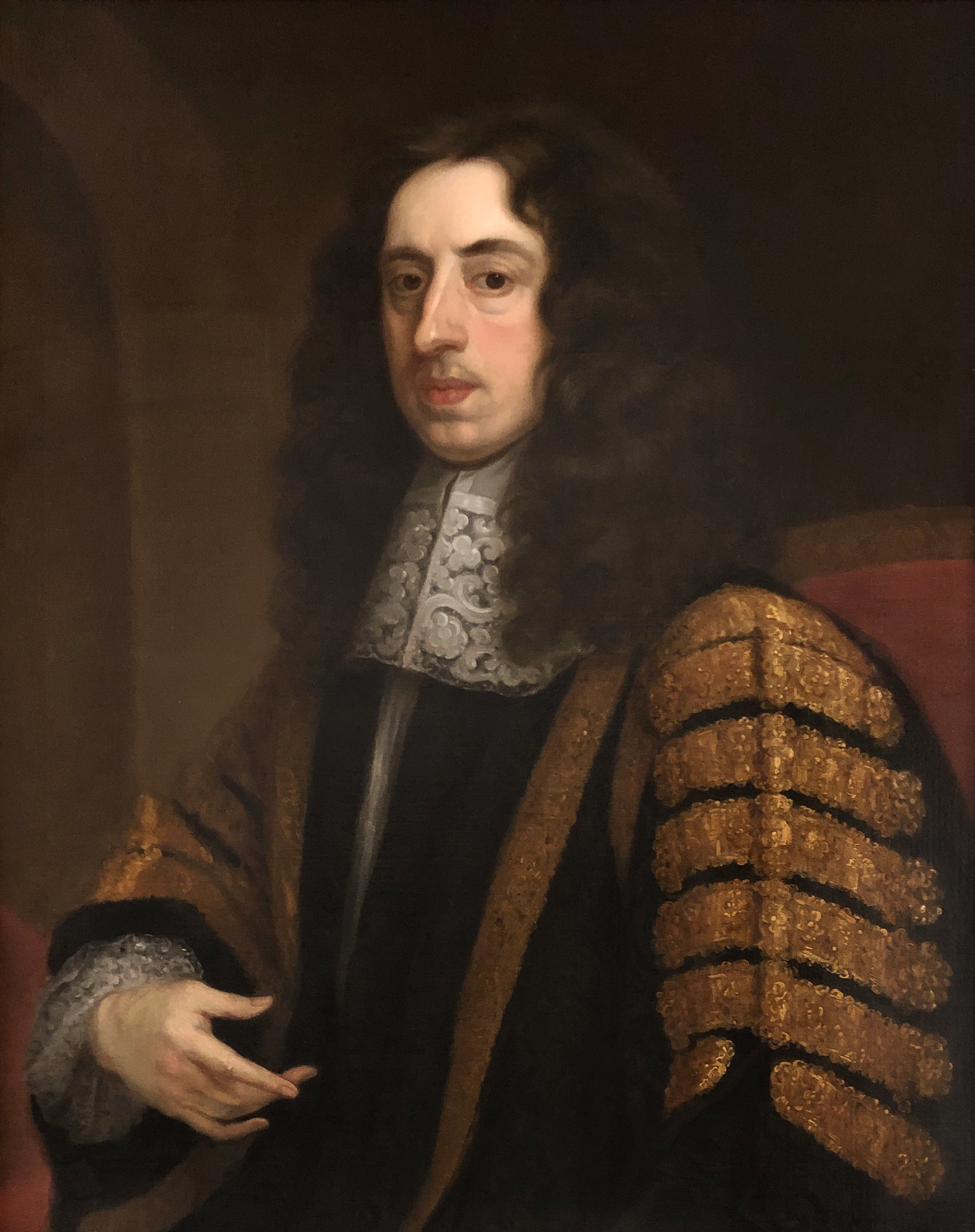
Portrait of The Earl of Nottingham at the Inner Temple next to Parliament Chamber (first floor) by Sir G. Kneller.

In April 1660, he was elected Member of Parliament for Canterbury and Mitchell in the Convention Parliament and chose to sit for Canterbury. Shortly afterwards he was appointed Solicitor General, in which capacity he served as the prosecutor of the regicides of Charles I, and was created a baronet the day after he was knighted. In May 1661, he was elected MP for Oxford University in the Cavalier Parliament. In 1665 the university created him a D.C.L. In 1670 he became Attorney General, and in 1675 Lord Chancellor. He was created Baron Finch in January 1673 and Earl of Nottingham in May 1681.

=== Popish Plot ===
During the Popish Plot, he played an active part in the interrogation of witnesses and preparation of the Crown's evidence. He is said to have been sceptical about the credibility of much of the evidence, and drew up a private report referring to the difficulties with Titus Oates' testimony. In general he behaved with moderation and restraint during the Plot, as shown most notably in his impartial conduct, as Lord High Steward, of the trial of William Howard, 1st Viscount Stafford, (apart from a curious remark that it was now clear that the Great Fire of London was a Catholic conspiracy). Kenyon notes that during the examination of the informer Miles Prance, Finch threatened him with the rack, but such a lapse was most uncharacteristic of Finch, who was a humane and civilised man; in any case, the threat could hardly have been serious since the use of the rack had been declared illegal in 1628.

=== Finch and Nottingham House, now Kensington Palace ===
The original early 17th-century building was constructed in the village of Kensington as Nottingham House for the Earl of Nottingham. It was acquired from his heir, who was Secretary of State to William III, in 1689, because the King wanted a residence near London but away from the smoky air of the capital, because he was asthmatic. At that time Kensington was a suburban village location outside London, but more accessible than Hampton Court, a water journey on the Thames. A private road was laid out from the Palace to Hyde Park Corner, broad enough for several carriages to travel abreast, part of which survives today as Rotten Row. The Palace was improved and extended by Sir Christopher Wren with pavilions attached to each corner of the central block, for it now needed paired Royal Apartments approached by the Great Stairs, a council chamber, and the Chapel Royal. Then, when Wren re-oriented the house to face west, he built north and south wings to flank the approach, made into a proper cour d'honneur that was entered through an archway surmounted by a clock tower. Nevertheless, as a private domestic retreat, it was referred to as Kensington House, rather than "Palace". The walled kitchen gardens at Kensington House supplied fruits and vegetables for the Court of St. James's.

== Personal life ==
On 30 July 1646, he was married to Elizabeth Harvey, daughter of William Harvey's younger brother Daniel, and his wife Elizabeth Kinnersley. Together, Elizabeth and Heneage were the parents of six children, including:

- Daniel Finch, 2nd Earl of Nottingham (1647–1730), who married Lady Essex Rich and secondly Hon. Anne Hatton.
- Margaret Finch (1648–1700), who married Denis MacCarthy of the MacCarthy Reagh.
- Heneage Finch, 1st Earl of Aylesford (c. 1649–1719), who had a distinguished career as a lawyer and politician and was Solicitor General 1679–86.
- Elizabeth Finch (1650–1675), who married Sir Samuel Grimston, 3rd Baronet.
- William Finch
- Charles Finch

Lord Nottingham died in Great Queen Street, London on 18 December 1682. He was buried in the church of Ravenstone in Buckinghamshire. His son Daniel inherited his earldom, and would later also inherit the Earldom of Winchilsea.

=== Character ===
According to the Encyclopædia Britannica Eleventh Edition, his contemporaries on both sides of politics agree in their high estimate of his integrity, moderation and eloquence, while his abilities as a lawyer are sufficiently attested by the fact that he is still spoken of as the father of equity. His most important contribution to the statute book is The Statute of Frauds. While attorney-general he superintended the edition of Sir Henry Hobart's Reports (1671). He also published Several Speeches and Discourses in the Tryal of the Judges of King Charles 1. (1660); Speeches to both Houses of Parliament (1679); Speech at the Sentence of Viscount Stafford (1680). He left Chancery Reports in MS., and notes on Coke's Institutes.

Lord Nottingham was also revered for his ability to speak, it being noted by Pepys, in 1664: 'I do really think that he is a man of as great eloquence as ever I heard or ever hope to hear in all my life'. By his contemporaries, he was styled the 'English Cicero' and the 'English Roscius'. As example of his 'smooth-tongued' prose, at a murder trial he spoke thus:

The same words that being spoken of a gentleman will bear no kind of action, when they are spoken to a Peer become scandalum magnatum. The Peer recovers great damage; the King inflicts fine or imprisonment; so that upon the matter the offender is bound in chains, and brought and laid at my Lord's feet. Now, for him whose honour is thus guarded by the law, to avenge himself by his sword, is a most unpardonable excuse. I do not pretend, I do not offer to say, that the killing of a man is more capital in the case of a Peer than would be in the case of a private gentleman: but I do presume to affirm, that no provocation in the world can make that to be but manslaughter in the case of a Peer that would be murder in the case of a gentleman.

Arms of Finch: Argent, a chevron between three griffins passant sable

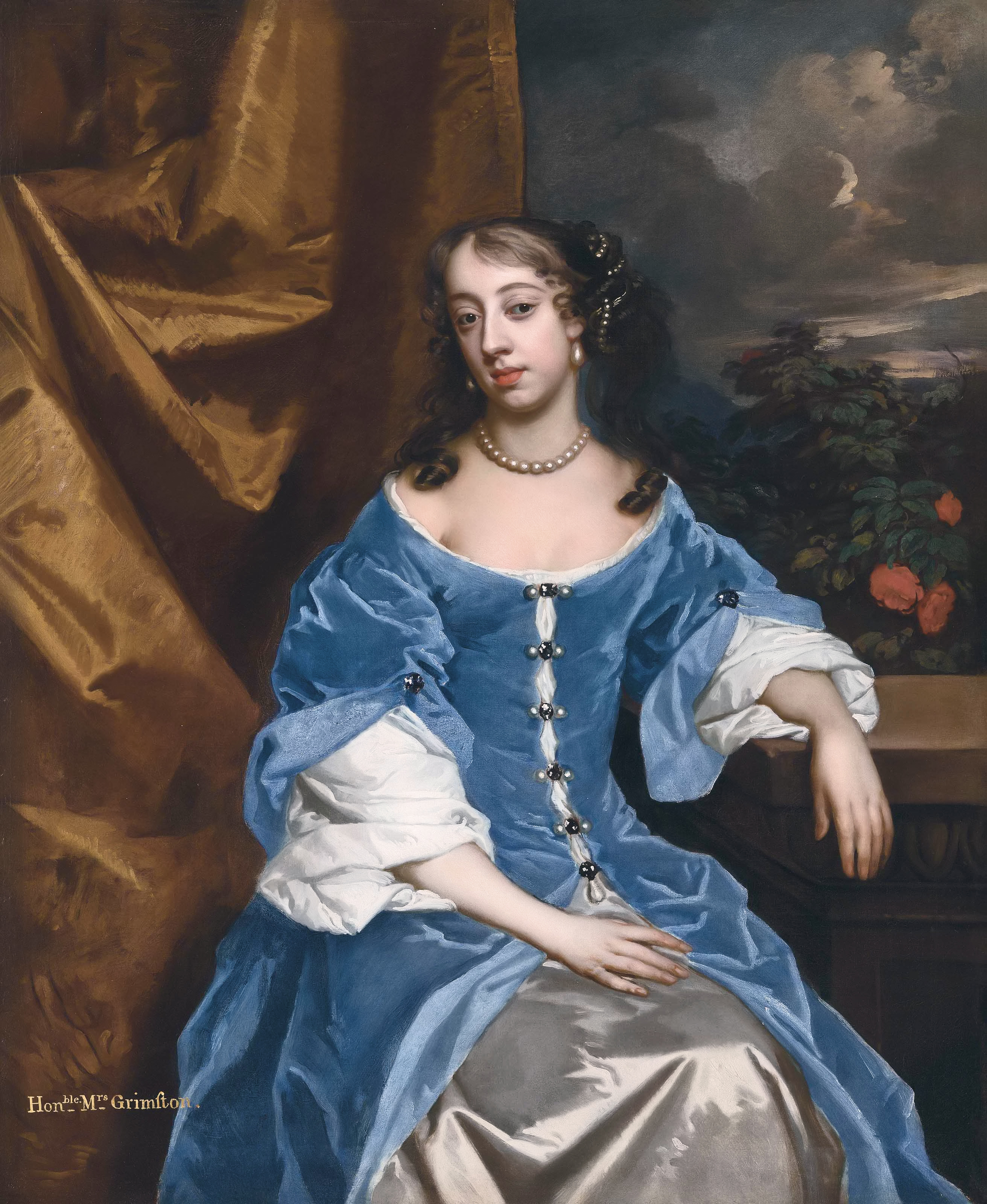
His daughter Elizabeth (Peter Lely)

Legal offices
Preceded by William Ellis	Solicitor General; 1660–1670	Succeeded by Sir Edward Turnour
Preceded by Sir Geoffrey Palmer, Bt	Attorney General; 1670–1673	Succeeded by Sir Francis North
Political offices
Preceded by The Earl of Shaftesbury (Lord Chancellor)	Lord Keeper; 1673–1675	Succeeded by Sir Francis North (Lord Keeper)
Preceded by The Earl of Shaftesbury (Lord Chancellor)	Lord Chancellor; 1675–1682	Succeeded by Sir Francis North (Lord Keeper)
Parliament of England
Preceded by Sir Edward Master; John Nutt	Member of Parliament for Canterbury; 1660; With: Sir Anthony Aucher	Succeeded by Francis Lovelace; Sir Edward Master
Preceded by Thomas Clayton; John Mylles	Member of Parliament for Oxford University; 1661–1674; With: Laurence Hyde	Succeeded by Laurence Hyde; Thomas Thynne
Peerage of England
New title	Earl of Nottingham; 7th creation 1681–1682	Succeeded by Daniel Finch
New title	Baron Finch of Daventry; 1673–1682	Succeeded by Daniel Finch
Baronetage of England
New title	Baronet (of Raunston, Buckinghamshire); 1660–1682	Succeeded by Daniel Finch
