= Edward Hoby =

English diplomat, Member of Parliament, scholar, and soldier

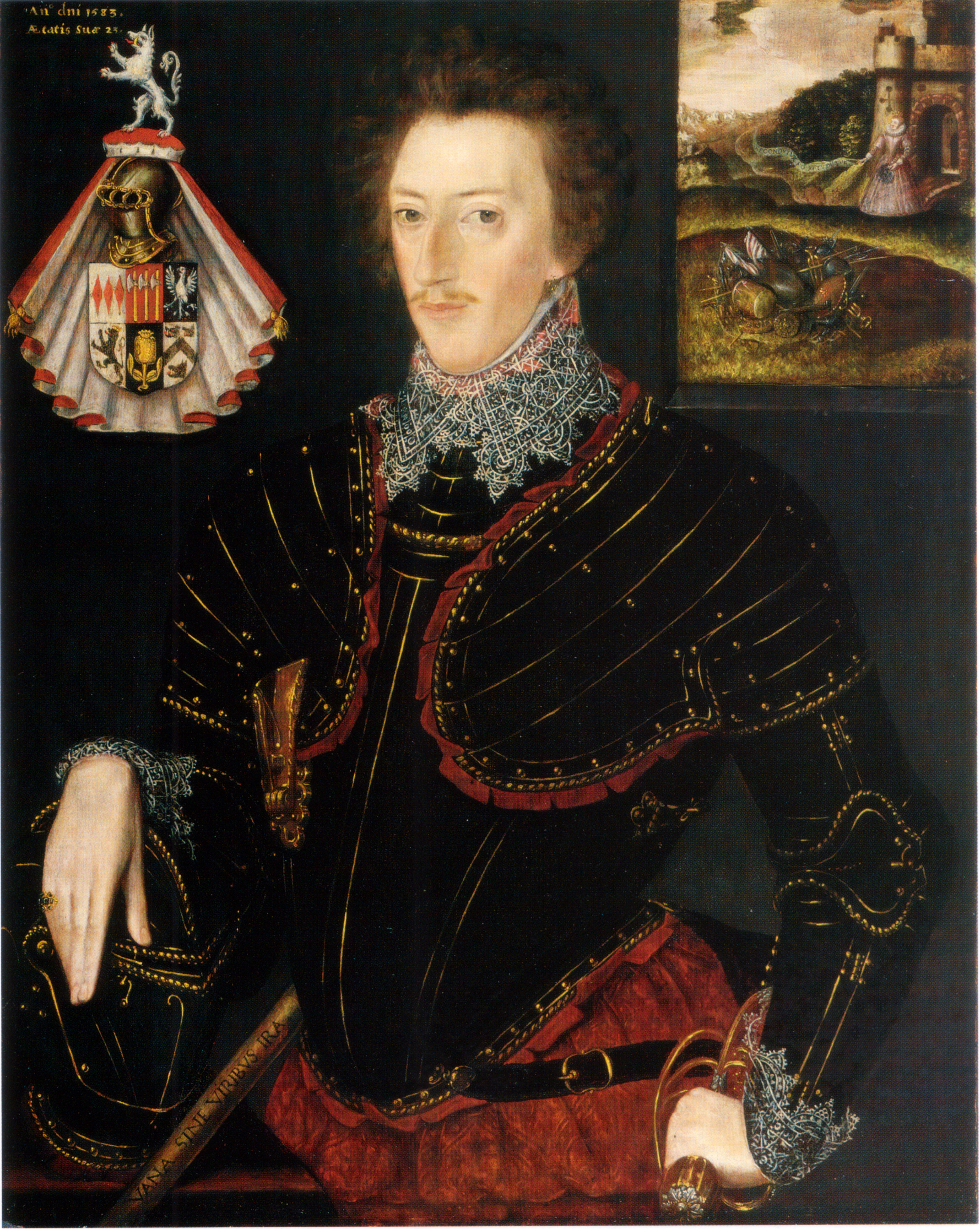
Sir Edward Hoby by an unknown artist, 1583

Sir Edward Hoby (1560 – 1 March 1617) was an English diplomat, Member of Parliament, scholar, and soldier during the reigns of Elizabeth I and James I. He was the son of Thomas Hoby and Elizabeth Cooke, the nephew of William Cecil, Lord Burghley, and the son-in-law of Queen Elizabeth's cousin Henry Carey, 1st Baron Hunsdon.

A favourite of King James, Hoby published several works supporting the Protestant cause as well as translations from French and Spanish. His heir was his illegitimate son, Peregrine Hoby.

== Biography ==
Born at Bisham Abbey, Berkshire, in 1560, Edward Hoby was the eldest son of Sir Thomas Hoby and his wife Elizabeth, third daughter of Sir Anthony Cooke or Coke of Gidea Hall, Essex. He was educated at Eton, where he formed a lasting friendship with Sir John Harington, and at Trinity College, Oxford. At Trinity Thomas Lodge, who later became a dramatist, was "servitor or scholar" under him.

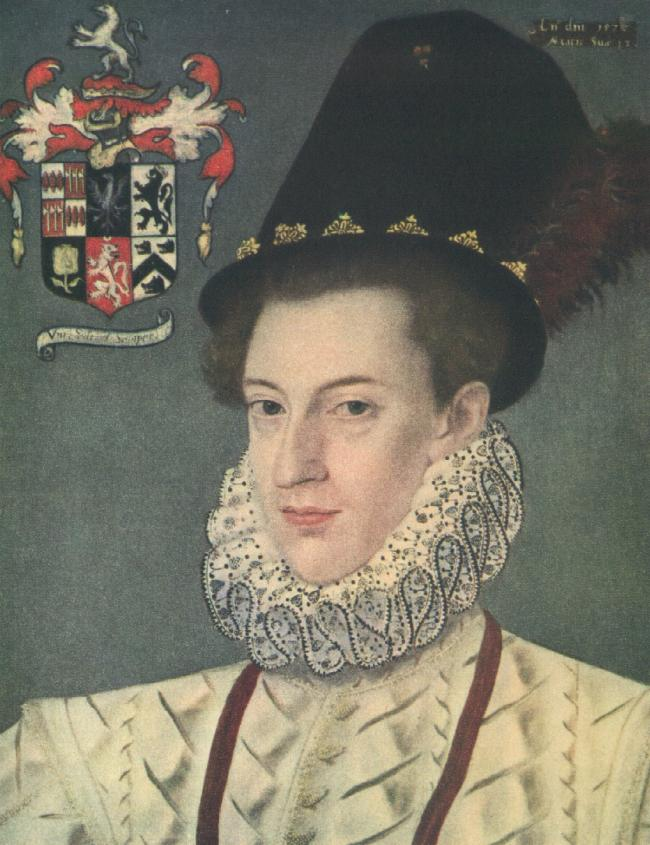
Portrait of Hoby, aged 18 (now in Ipswich Museum)

Under the auspices of his uncle, Lord Burghley, he rose into high favour at the Elizabethan court and was frequently employed on confidential missions. Hoby's fortunes were further advanced by his marriage, on 21 May 1582, to Margaret, daughter of Henry Carey, 1st Baron Hunsdon, cousin of Queen Elizabeth. The day after the wedding he was knighted by the Queen.

In August 1584 he accompanied his father-in-law Hunsdon on a special mission to Scotland. His affability and learning greatly impressed King James VI (later James of England), and after attending the Scottish ambassador, Patrick, Master of Gray, as far as Durham, Hoby received from the Scottish king a flattering letter, dated 24 October 1584, in which James intimated his longing for his company, and how he had "commanded his ambassador to sue for it". James Stewart, Earl of Arran also wrote to the same effect, and enclosed a "small token", which he begged Hoby to wear in "testimony of their brotherhood". These amenities proved displeasing to Elizabeth, and Hoby found it convenient for a time to plead the ague as an excuse for not attending the court.

On 24 September 1586, he was returned as one of the two members of parliament for Queenborough, Kent, and gained distinction as a speaker in Parliament. That October he complained that he had been "not only bitten but overpassed by the hard hand of" Francis Walsingham, and appealed to Secretary William Davison to use his influence with the queen on his behalf. Restored to favour, in July 1588, Hoby was chosen to report to the queen on the progress of the preparations against the Spanish Armada. That October (1588), he was elected a knight of the shire for Berkshire. He was made justice of the peace for Middlesex by a special renewal of the commission on 17 December 1591. In 1592 he was chosen as a knight of the shire for Kent, and in 1594 was granted letters patent for buying and providing wool for sale in England for ten years, and the grant was ratified in the succeeding reign.

Hoby accompanied the Earl of Essex on his expedition to Cádiz in 1596, and was made constable of Queenborough Castle, Isle of Sheppey, Kent, on 9 July 1597. On the following 28 October Hoby received a commission to search out and prosecute all offences against the statute prohibiting the exportation of iron from England, his reward being half the forfeitures arising therefrom. He represented Rochester in the parliaments of 1597, 1601, February 1604, and 1614. James I made him a Gentleman of the Privy Chamber, forgave his arrears of rent of the Royal Manor of Shirland in Derbyshire (amounting to over £500), and on 21 August 1607 granted him an exclusive licence to buy wool in Warwickshire and Staffordshire. He frequently entertained the king at Bisham.

Hoby's first wife died in 1605. He subsequently married Elizabeth (d. 1611/12), daughter of John Danvers in 1606 and Cicely Unton (d. 1618), the daughter of Sir Edward Unton and Lady Anne Seymour, and widow of John Wentworth of Gosfield Hall, Essex in 1614.

== Death ==
Hoby died in Queenborough Castle on 1 March 1617. He and his wives had no children, but he brought up his illegitimate son by Katherine Pinkney, Peregrine Hoby, and made the boy his heir.

== Works ==
An excellent scholar himself, Hoby cultivated the friendship of learned men, especially that of William Camden, who eulogises his bounty and accomplishments in his Britannia. Camden also dedicated his Hibernia (1587) to him.

In 1612 Hoby presented a copy of Sir Henry Savile's sumptuous edition of St Chrysostom to the library of Trinity College, Oxford. Hoby was also a keen Protestant theologian, sparring in print with the Roman Catholic convert Theophilus Higgons and the Jesuit John Fludd or Floyd.

Hoby's theological writings include:

- A Letter to Mr. T[heophilus] H[iggons], late Minister: now Fugitive ... in answere of his first Motive, (1609), which was answered by Higgons during the same year.
- A Counter-snarle for Ishmael Rabshakeh a Cycropedian Lycaonite (1613), being a reply to The Overthrow of the Protestants Pulpet Babels, by "J. R." (John Fludd or Floyd). Floyd forthwith replied with his Purgatories triumph over Hell, maugre the barking of Cerberus in Syr Edward Hobyes "Counter-snarle" (1613).
- A Curry-combe for a сохе-combe . . . In answer to a lewd Libel lately foricated by Jabal Rachil against Sir Edward Hobies "Counter-Snarle," entitled "Purgatories triumph over Hell," (1615), written under the ponderous pseudonym of "Nick-Groome of the Hobie-Stable Reginoburgi," in the form of a dialogue.

Hoby also translated Matthieu Coignet's Politique discourses on trueth and lying from French (1586), and Bernardino de Mendoza's Theorique and Practise of Warre from Spanish (1597).
