= Thomas Finch (soldier) =

English nobleman, knight and soldier

Arms of Finch: Argent, a chevron between three griffins passant sable

Sir Thomas Finch (d. 1563) was an English nobleman, knight, soldier, and military commander.

== Life and family ==
Finch was the second son of Sir William Finch, who was knighted for his services at the siege of Therouanne in 1513, and attended Henry VIII with a great retinue in 1520. His mother, his father's first wife, was Elizabeth, daughter of Sir James Cromer of Tunstall, Kent, and widow of Sir Richard Lovelace. An elder brother, Lawrence, who married Mary Kempe, died without issue, and Thomas succeeded to his father's property. He was trained as a soldier, and in 1554 was engaged in suppressing Wyatt's rebellion in Kent. On the day after Mary's coronation (2 October 1553) he was knighted.

Soon after Elizabeth's accession (1559), Nicholas Harpsfeld, archdeacon of Canterbury, threatened violent resistance to the new ecclesiastical legislation, and Finch was despatched to Canterbury to disarm his household. Early in 1563 he was appointed, in succession to Sir Adrian Poynings, knight-marshal of the army then engaged in war about Le Havre. He at once sent his half-brother, Sir Erasmus Finch, to take temporary charge, and his kinsman Thomas Finch to act as provost-marshal. He himself embarked in the Greyhound in March with two hundred followers, among them James and John Wentworth, brothers of Lord Wentworth, another brother of his own, a brother of Lord Cobham, and a nephew of Ambrose Dudley, earl of Warwick. When nearing Havre the ship was driven back by contrary winds towards Rye. Finch and his friends induced the captain - 'a very good seaman,' says Stow - 'to thrust into the haven before the tide,' and 'so they all perished' with the exception of 'seven of the meaner sort' (19 March). The news reached the court two days later, and produced great consternation. A ballad commemorating the misfortune was licensed to Richard Griffith at the time. Finch was buried at Eastwell, Kent.

== Marriage and Family ==
Finch married Catherine, daughter and coheiress of Sir Thomas Moyle, chancellor of the court of augmentations, and thus came into possession of Moyle's property of Eastwell, at his death 2 October 1560. He owned other land in Kent, and, on 9 December 1558, Aloisi Pruili, Cardinal Pole's secretary, requested Cecil to direct Finch to allow the officers of the cardinal, then just dead, to dispose of oxen, hay, wood, and deer belonging to their late master in St. Augustine's Park, Canterbury.

His widow remarried Nicholas St. Leger, and died on 9 February 1586–87. Of his children, three sons and a daughter survived him. The second son, Sir Henry Finch, serjeant-at-law, is separately noticed. The third, Thomas, died without issue in the expedition to Portugal in 1589. The daughter, Jane, married George Wyatt of Allington Castle, Boxley, Kent, son of Sir Thomas Wyatt, whose rebellion Finch had been sent to quell in 1554. Finch's heir, Moyle, created a baronet 27 May 1611, married in 1574 Elizabeth, daughter of Sir Thomas Heneage of Copt Hall, Essex; inherited Eastwell on his mother's death in 1587; obtained a license to enclose one thousand acres of land there, and to embattle his house, 18 January 1589, and died 14 December 1614. His widow was created, in consideration of her father's services, Viscountess Maidstone, 8 July 1623, and Countess of Winchilsea, 12 July 1628, both titles being granted with limitation to heirs male. She died and was buried at Eastwell in 1633. Her eldest son, Thomas, succeeded her as Earl of Winchilsea. Her fourth son, Sir Heneage Finch, was speaker of the House of Commons, 1626–31.
