= Earl of Winchilsea =

Title in the Peerage of England

Earldom of Winchilsea held with Earldom of Nottingham
- Quarterly, 1st & 4th: azure, a chevron between three garbs or; (Hatton) 2nd & 3rd, argent, a chevron between three griffins, passant, wings endorsed sable (Finch)
- Creation date: Winchilsea 1628; Nottingham 1681
- Created by: Charles I (Winchilsea); Charles II (Nottingham)
- Peerage: Peerage of England
- First holder: Elizabeth Finch, 1st Countess of Winchilsea
- Present holder: Daniel Finch-Hatton, 17th Earl of Winchilsea, 12th Earl of Nottingham
- Heir apparent: Tobias Finch-Hatton, Viscount Maidstone
- Remainder to: the 1st Earl's heirs male whatsoever
- Subsidiary titles: Viscount Maidstone; Baron Finch of Daventry; Baronet of Eastwell; Baronet of Raunston
- Seat: Kirby Hall
- Former seats: Eastwell Park; Haverholme Priory; Burley, Rutland
- Motto: Finch : Nil conscire sibi ("Conscious of no evil"); Hatton : Virtus tutissima cassis ("Virtue is the safest helmet")

Earl of Winchilsea is a title in the Peerage of England. It has been held by the Finch-Hatton family of Kent, and united with the title of Earl of Nottingham under a single holder since 1729.

The Finch family is believed to be descended from Henry FitzHerbert, Lord Chamberlain to Henry I (r. 1100–1135). The name change to Finch came in the 1350s after marriage to an heiress of the Finch family. The Herbert family of Wales, Earls of Aylesford, Earls of Pembroke, share common ancestry but bear differenced arms.

A later member of the family, Sir William Finch, was knighted in 1513. His son Sir Thomas Finch (died 1563), was also knighted for his share in suppressing Sir Thomas Wyatt's insurrection against Queen Mary I, and was the son-in-law of Sir Thomas Moyle, some of whose lands Finch's wife inherited. Thomas's eldest son Moyle Finch represented Weymouth, Kent and Winchelsea in the House of Commons. In 1611 he was created a baronet, of Eastwell in the County of Kent.

In 1660 the 3rd Earl of Winchilsea was created Baron FitzHerbert of Eastwell, Kent, in recompense for his efficient aid in the Restoration of the Monarchy.

== History ==
Sir Moyle Finch, 1st Baronet of Eastwell, married Elizabeth Heneage, only daughter of Sir Thomas Heneage (1532–1595), Vice-Chamberlain of the Household to Queen Elizabeth I. After Sir Moyle's death in 1614, Elizabeth and her sons made considerable efforts to have the family's status elevated. On 8 July 1623, Elizabeth was raised to the Peerage of England as Viscountess Maidstone, and on 12 July 1628 she was further honoured when she was made Countess of Winchilsea. Lady Winchilsea and Sir Moyle Finch's youngest son, the Hon. Sir Heneage Finch, served as Speaker of the House of Commons and was the father of Heneage Finch, who was the Lord Chancellor of England and created Earl of Nottingham in 1681.

Sir Moyle Finch was succeeded in the baronetcy by his eldest son Theophilus, the 2nd Baronet (1573–1619). He sat as Member of Parliament for Great Yarmouth but died childless circa 1619. He was succeeded by his younger brother Thomas, the 3rd Baronet. He represented Winchelsea and Kent in the House of Commons. In 1634, he also succeeded his mother as the second Earl of Winchilsea.

The third Earl, son of the second, supported the Restoration in 1660 and was thanked for his efforts the same year when he was created Baron FitzHerbert of Eastwell, in the County of Kent, in the Peerage of England.

The third earl's eldest son, William Finch, Viscount Maidstone, predeceased his father, but his son Charles succeeded as fourth Earl. He served as President of the Board of Trade and as Lord Lieutenant of Kent.

The fourth Earl had no children and the titles passed to his uncle, Heneage Finch, 5th Earl of Winchilsea. He had earlier represented Hythe in Parliament. His wife Anne Finch, Countess of Winchilsea, was a well-known poet.

The fifth Earl was also childless and was succeeded by his half-brother, John Finch, 6th Earl of Winchilsea.

He never married, and on his death in 1729 the Barony of FitzHerbert of Eastwell became extinct.

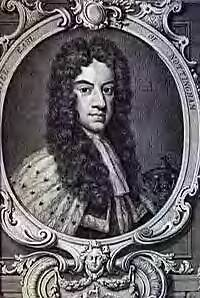
Daniel Finch, 7th Earl of Winchilsea, 2nd Earl of Nottingham, who married Hon. Anne Hatton.

The remaining titles passed to his second cousin, Daniel Finch, 2nd Earl of Nottingham, who became the 7th Earl of Winchilsea as well (see below for earlier history of this branch of the family). He was the eldest son of The Lord Chancellor of England, Heneage Finch, 1st Earl of Nottingham.

He was a noted statesman and served as First Lord of the Admiralty, Secretary of State for the Southern Department, Secretary of State for the Northern Department and as Lord President of the Council.

His son the 8th Earl of Winchilsea was also a politician and held office as First Lord of the Admiralty and as Lord President of the Council.

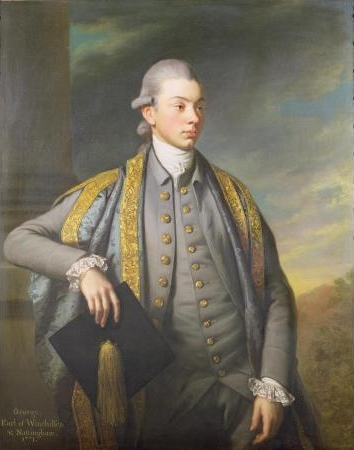
George Finch, 9th Earl of Winchilsea by Nathaniel Dance-Holland

The 8th Earl was childless and was succeeded by his nephew, the 9th Earl, son of the Hon. William Finch, second son of the 2nd Earl of Nottingham. The 9th Earl was Lord Lieutenant of Rutland for many years and was also an influential figure in the history of cricket.

The 9th Earl died unmarried and was succeeded by his first cousin once removed, the 10th Earl, son of George Finch-Hatton (1747–1823) (who had assumed the additional surname of Hatton), son of the Hon. Edward Finch, fifth son of the 2nd Earl of Nottingham, and his wife the Hon. Anne Hatton, who was the daughter of Christopher Hatton, 1st Viscount Hatton (see the Viscount Hatton) and a relation of the famous Sir Christopher Hatton. The 10th Earl is famous for his duel with the Duke of Wellington, who was Prime Minister at the time. The duel, which was over the issue of Catholic emancipation and related to insulting remarks made by the Earl, took place at Battersea Fields on 21 March 1829. Both men deliberately aimed wide and Winchilsea apologised.

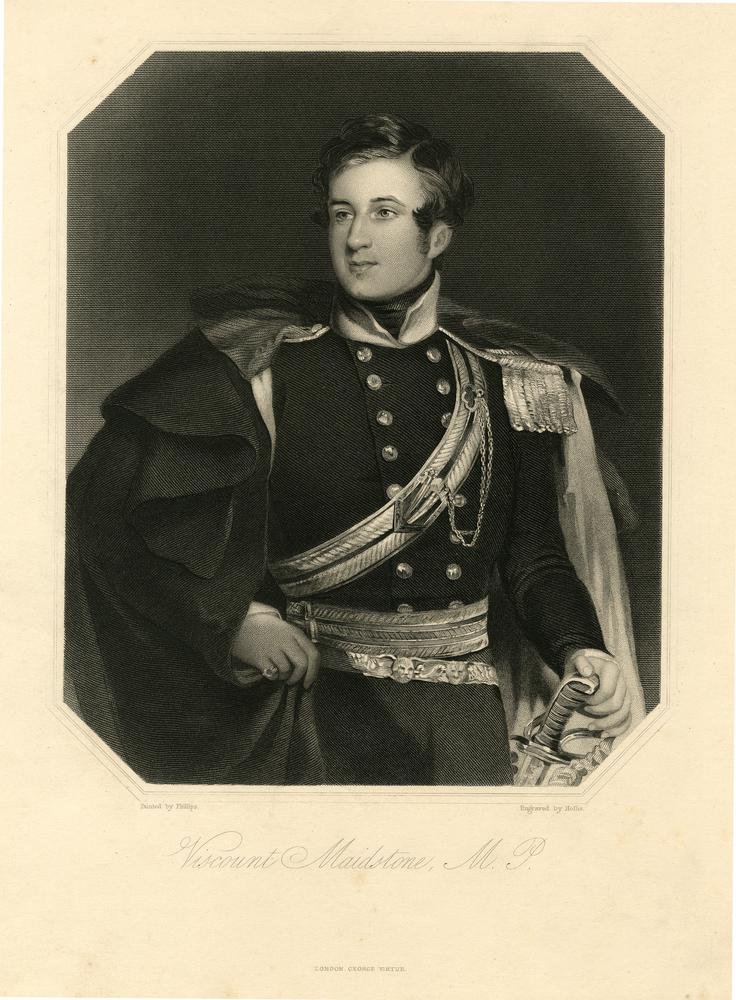
George Finch-Hatton, 11th Earl of Winchilsea and 6th Earl of Nottingham.

His son the 11th Earl had represented Northamptonshire North in Parliament as a Tory. He died without surviving male issue and was succeeded by his half-brother, the 12th Earl, who had sat briefly as Conservative Member of Parliament for Lincolnshire South and for Spalding. He was succeeded by his younger brother, the 13th Earl. As of 2017, the titles are held by his great-great-grandson, the 17th Earl of Winchilsea and 12th Earl of Nottingham (the title having descended from father to son), who succeeded in 1999.

=== Other members ===
The Hon. Sir Heneage Finch was the third and youngest son of Sir Moyle Finch, 1st Baronet and the Countess of Winchilsea. He served as Speaker of the House of Commons from 1625 to 1628. His son was Heneage Finch, later 1st Earl of Nottingham, was a prominent lawyer and politician and served as Lord Chancellor of England from 1675 to 1682. He was created a baronet, of Raunston in the County of Buckingham, in the Baronetage of England in 1660 and in 1673 he was raised to the Peerage of England as Baron Finch of Daventry in the County of Northampton. In 1681, he was further honoured when he was made Earl of Nottingham, also in the Peerage of England. He was succeeded by his son, Daniel Finch, 2nd Earl of Nottingham, who in 1729 succeeded his second cousin as the 7th Earl of Winchilsea. See above for further history of the titles.

Several other members of the Finch family have also gained distinction. John Finch, 1st Baron Finch of Fordwich, was the son of Sir Henry Finch, younger brother of Sir Moyle Finch, 1st Baronet of Eastwell. Later the Hon. Heneage Finch, younger brother of the 2nd Earl of Nottingham, was made the 1st Earl of Aylesford in 1714.

The Hon. Edward Finch, the fifth son of the 1st Earl of Nottingham, was a composer and sat as Member of Parliament for Cambridge University. He later took holy orders and served as Prebendary of York and Canterbury. The Hon. Edward Finch-Hatton, fifth son of the 2nd Earl of Nottingham, sat as Member of Parliament for Cambridge University from 1727 to 1768.

The Hon. Denys Finch Hatton, brother of the 14th Earl and nephew to Harold Heneage, moved to East Africa and became a noted pilot and hunter, and a close friend of writer Karen Blixen. In the award winning film "Out of Africa" he was famously portrayed by Robert Redford opposite Meryl Streep.

The Hon. Harold Heneage Finch-Hatton, fourth son of the 10th Earl, represented Newark in the House of Commons and later wrote books about Australia. The town of Finch Hatton, Queensland in Australia is believed to be named after him.

The earldom of 1628 is sometimes written Winchelsea, after the modern spelling of the town (and Cinque Port) in East Sussex.

== Family seat and motto ==
The ancestral family seat of Earls of Winchilsea was at Eastwell Park old manor house, until the last 6th Earl of Winchilsea died in 1729, then the title and estate was inherited by his second cousin, Daniel Finch, the 2nd Earl of Nottingham who also become 7th Earl of Winchilsea.

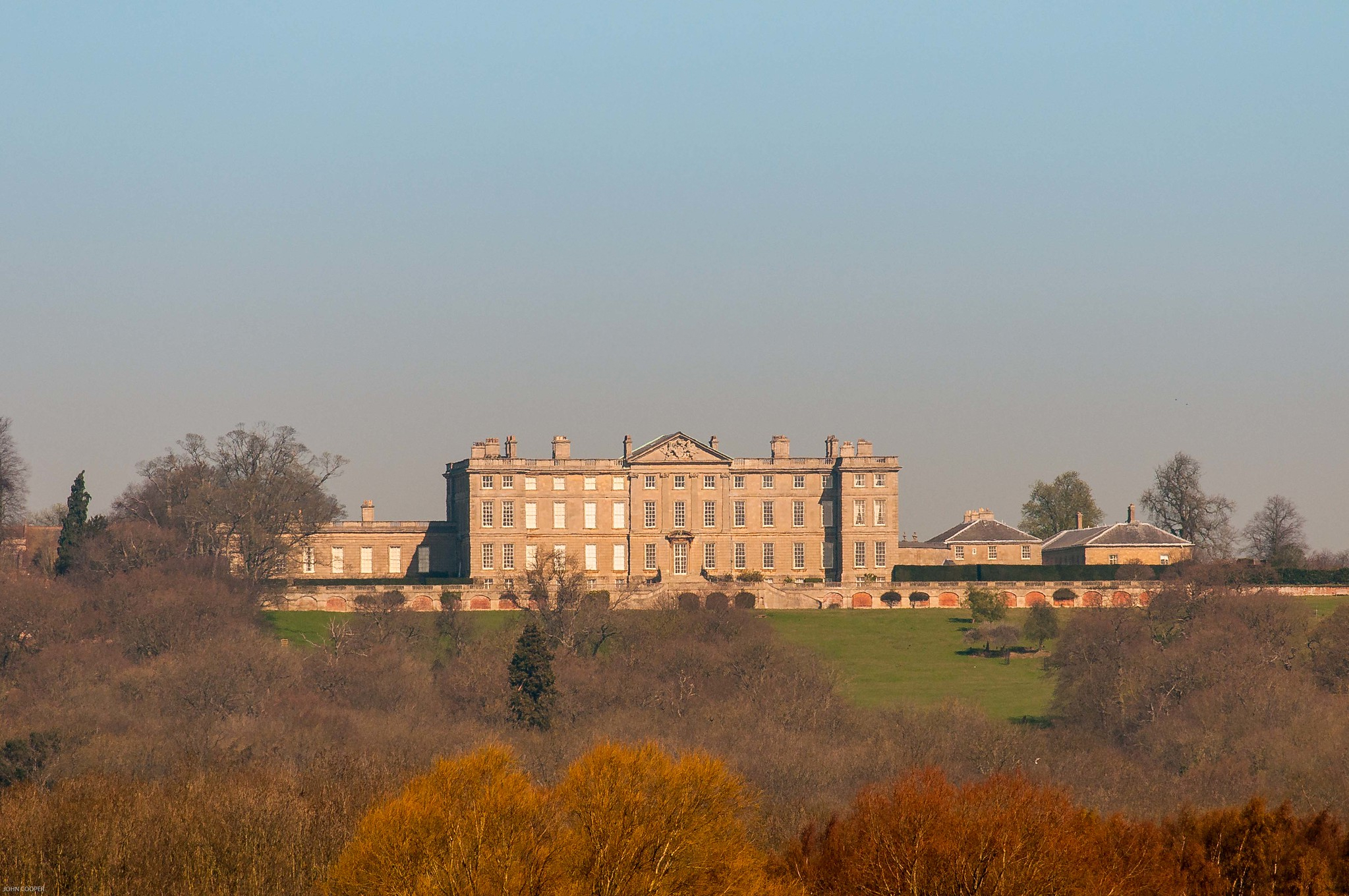
Burley on the Hill House built by Daniel Finch 7th Earl of Winchilsea

The 7th Earl of Winchilsea and 2nd Earl of Nottingham had previously built the magnificent Burley on the Hill house during the 1690s, the new palatial residence was built as the seat of the Earls of Nottingham. The Earl chose Burley's location to be nearer to his wife's family (the Hattons) at Kirby Hall. Burley would served as the family seat until the unmarried 9th Earl of Winchilsea sought and obtained an act of Parliament to break the entail of the estate, and left Burley house to his illegitimate son, George Finch, rather than to his first cousin and his son the future 10th Earl.

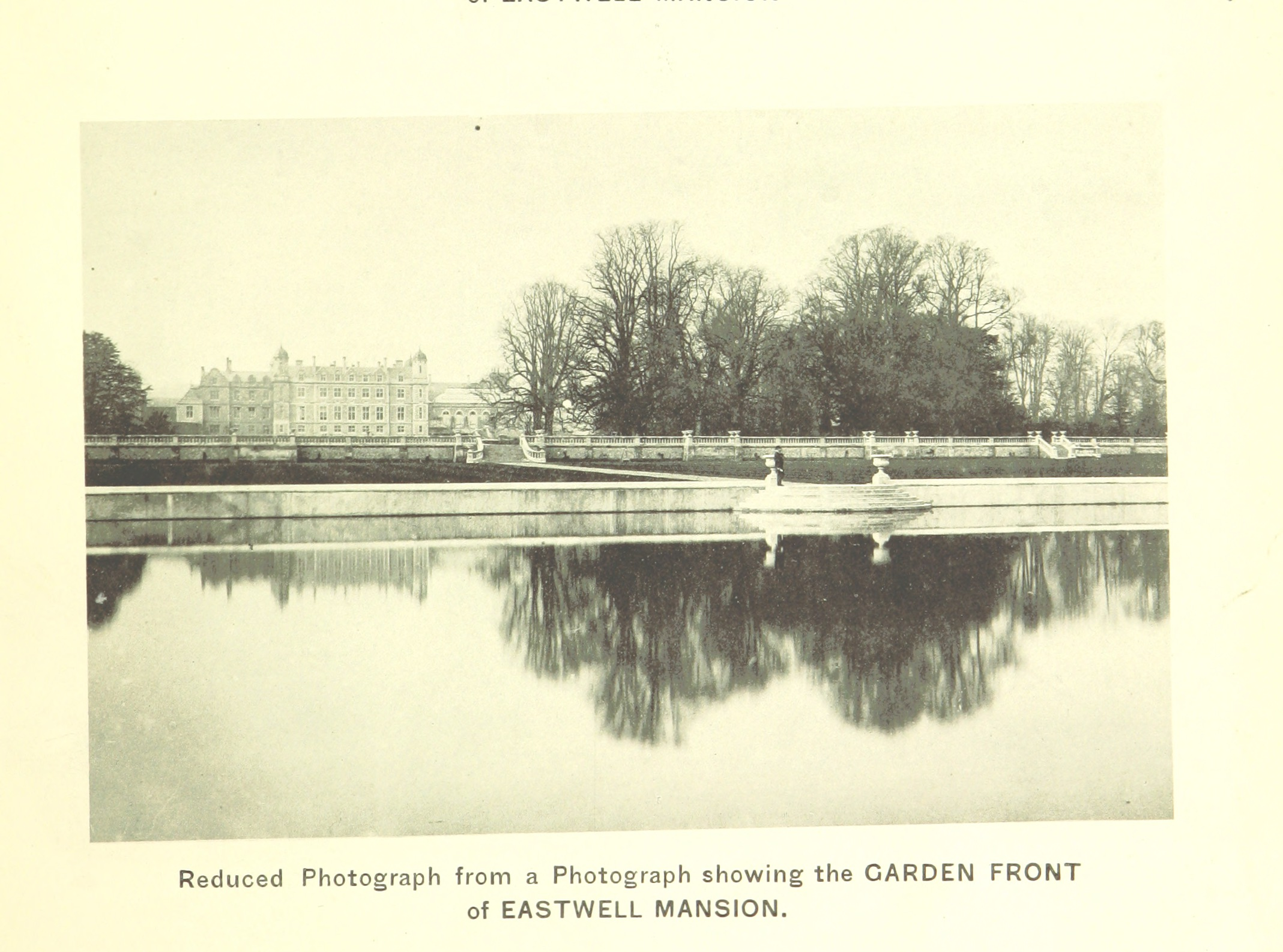
Eastwell Park, Kent

Then Eastwell Park became the family seat again for George William Finch-Hatton, 10th Earl of Winchilsea, 5th Earl of Nottingham. Eastwell Manor had previously been rebuilt in 1790s by Bonomi into a substantial residence for the 10th Earl's parents, George Finch-Hatton esq and Lady Elizabeth Murray. The Eastwell estate, near Ashford, Kent, was lived in by the Earls of Winchilsea until the mid-1860s, when the 11th Earl had to leave the property due to financial difficulties; it was later occupied by Prince Alfred, Duke of Edinburgh, the second son of Queen Victoria. It was sold in 1890s by the 12th Earl.

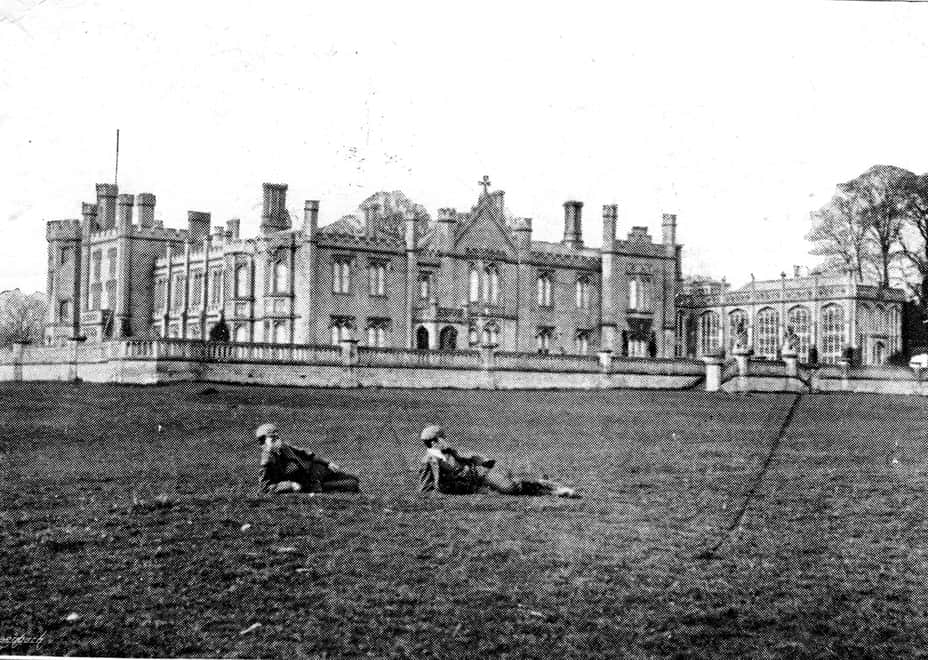
Haverholme Priory 1903. The boys are thought to be Denys and Guy Finch Hatton, 14th Earl of Winchilsea

Haverholme Priory was an estate in Lincolnshire, inherited by the 10th Earl from his childless aunt and uncle in law, Sir Jenison Gordon. After the Eastwell estate was let go, Haverholme Priory became the family seat for the 12th Earl and 13th Earl of Winchilsea until it was eventually sold and demolished in 1920s.

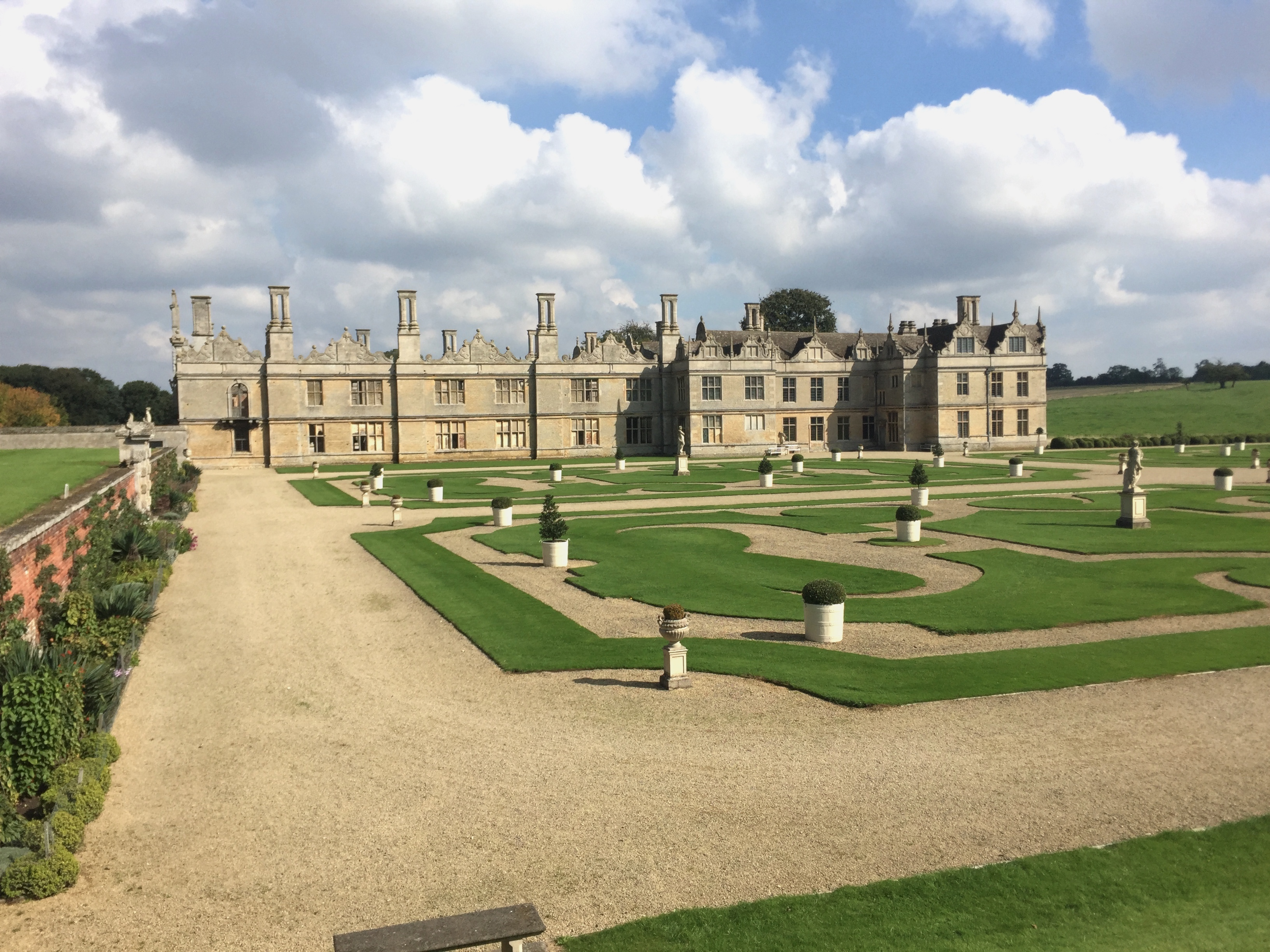
Kirby Hall, Corby, Northamptonshire

The Kirby Hall estate, near Corby, Northamptonshire was inherited by Edward Finch-Hatton, through his mother Anne Hatton, Countess of Winchilsea, sole heiress to Viscount Hatton, then went to his eldest son George Finch-Hatton esq, in turned went to his son the 10th Earl and so forth. The Hatton estate is still (2024) owned by the present Earl of Winchilsea, although the palatial hall – now partially de-roofed – is no longer lived in by the family. Kirby hall itself and the adjacent gardens are today administered by English Heritage.

The Finch family motto is Nil conscire sibi ("Conscious of no evil"), the Hatton motto is Virtus tutissima cassis ("Virtue is the safest helmet").

== Finch baronets, of Eastwell (1611) ==
- Sir Moyle Finch, 1st Baronet (died 1614)
- Sir Theophilus Finch, 2nd Baronet (c. 1573–c. 1619)
- Sir Thomas Finch, 3rd Baronet (1578–1639) (succeeded as Earl of Winchilsea in 1634)

Arms of Finch: Argent, a chevron between three griffins passant sable

== Earls of Winchilsea (1628) and Nottingham (1681) ==
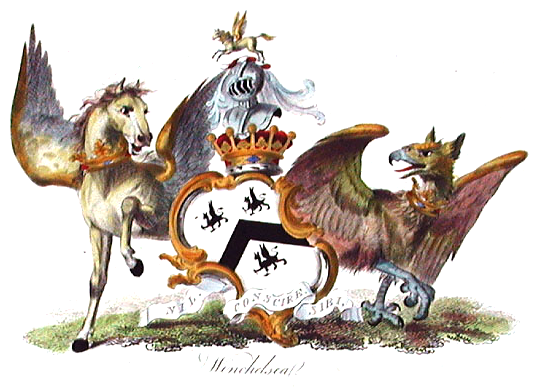
Coat of arms of Finch, Earl of Winchilsea in 1764

Other titles (1st holder onwards): Viscount Maidstone (Eng 1623)
Other titles (3rd-6th Earls): Baron FitzHerbert of Eastwell (Eng 1660, extinct 1729)
Other titles (7th Earl onwards): Baron Finch of Daventry (Eng 1673)

- Elizabeth Finch, 1st Countess of Winchilsea, 1st Viscountess Maidstone (1556–1634)
- Thomas Finch, 2nd Earl of Winchilsea, 2nd Viscount Maidstone (1578–1639)
- Heneage Finch, 3rd Earl of Winchilsea, 3rd Viscount Maidstone, 1st Baron FitzHerbert of Eastwell (c. 1635–1689)
  - William Finch, Viscount Maidstone (1652–1672)
- Charles Finch, 4th Earl of Winchilsea, 4th Viscount Maidstone, 2nd Baron FitzHerbert of Eastwell (1672–1712)
- Heneage Finch, 5th Earl of Winchilsea, 5th Viscount Maidstone, 3rd Baron FitzHerbert of Eastwell (1657–1726)
- John Finch, 6th Earl of Winchilsea, 6th Viscount Maidstone, 4th Baron FitzHerbert of Eastwell (1683–1729)
- Daniel Finch, 7th Earl of Winchilsea, 2nd Earl of Nottingham (1647–1730)
- Daniel Finch, 8th Earl of Winchilsea, 3rd Earl of Nottingham (c. 1709–1769)
- George Finch, 9th Earl of Winchilsea, 4th Earl of Nottingham (1752–1826)
- George William Finch-Hatton, 10th Earl of Winchilsea, 5th Earl of Nottingham (1791–1858)
- George James Finch-Hatton, 11th Earl of Winchilsea, 6th Earl of Nottingham (1815–1887)
  - George William Heneage Finch-Hatton, Viscount Maidstone (1852–1879)
- Murray Edward Gordon Finch-Hatton, 12th Earl of Winchilsea, 7th Earl of Nottingham (1851–1898)
  - George Edward Henry Finch-Hatton, Viscount Maidstone (1882–1892)
- Henry Stormont Finch-Hatton, 13th Earl of Winchilsea, 8th Earl of Nottingham (1852–1927)
- Guy Montagu George Finch-Hatton, 14th Earl of Winchilsea, 9th Earl of Nottingham (1885–1939)
- Christopher Guy Heneage Finch-Hatton, 15th Earl of Winchilsea, 10th Earl of Nottingham (1911–1950)
- Christopher Denys Stormont Finch-Hatton, 16th Earl of Winchilsea, 11th Earl of Nottingham (1936–1999)
- Daniel James Hatfield Finch-Hatton, 17th Earl of Winchilsea, 12th Earl of Nottingham (born 1967)

The heir apparent is the present holder's elder son Tobias Joshua Stormont Finch-Hatton, Viscount Maidstone (born 1998).

== Earls of Nottingham (1681) ==
- Heneage Finch, 1st Earl of Nottingham (1621–1682)
- Daniel Finch, 2nd Earl of Nottingham (1647–1730) (succeeded as Earl of Winchilsea in 1729)

== Family tree ==
Mansfield and Finch family tree including peerages of Winchilsea and Nottingham

Lord Scone, 1605; Viscount Stormont, 1621	Viscount Maidstone, 1623; Earl of Winchilsea, 1628
David Murray d. 1631; 1st Viscount of Stormont, etc.	Mungo Murray; 1580–1641/1642; 2nd Viscount of Stormont, etc.	Moyle Finch c. 1550–1614; 1st Baronet of Eastwell	Elizabeth Finch; 1556–1634; 1st Countess of Winchilsea and Viscountess Maidstone
David Murray of Balgonie, Fifeshire d. 1628	Thomas Finch; 1578–1639; 2nd Earl of Winchilsea, etc.	Heneage Finch; 1580–1631
Lord Balvaird, 1641
Andrew Murray c. 1597–1644; 1st Lord Balvaird	James Johnstone Murray d. 1658; 2nd Earl of Annandale, etc. 3rd Viscount of Stormont, etc.
Baron FitzHerbert of Eastwell in the County of Kent, 1660	Baron Finch of Daventry, 1673; Earl of Nottingham (7th creation), 1681
David Murray c. 1636–1668; 4th Viscount Stormont, etc., 2nd Lord Balvaird	Heneage Finch c. 1628–1689; 3rd Earl of Winchilsea, etc., 1st Baron FitzHerbert	Heneage Finch; 1620–1682; 1st Earl of Nottingham, etc.
David Murray; 1665–1731; 5th Viscount of Stormont, etc., 3rd Lord Balvaird	Marjory Scott d. 1746	William Finch c. 1651–1672 styled Viscount Maidstone	Heneage Finch; 1657–1726; 5th Earl of Winchilsea, etc., 3rd Baron FitzHerbert	John Finch; 1682/83–1729; 6th Earl of Winchilsea, etc., 4th Baron FitzHerbert	Daniel Finch; 1647–1730; 7th Earl of Winchilsea, etc., 2nd Earl of Nottingham, etc.	Anne Hatton
Barony FitzHerbert extinct, 1729
Baron Mansfield, 1756; Earl of Mansfield, in the County of Nottingham, 1776; Earl of Mansfield, in the County of Middlesex, 1792
David Murray c. 1689–1748; 6th Viscount of Stormont, etc., 4th Lord Balvaird	James Murray c. 1690–1770	Charles Finch; 1672–1712; 4th Earl of Winchilsea, etc.	Marjory Murray d. c. 1765	John Hay of Cromlix; 1691–1740	Daniel Finch; 1689–1769; 8th Earl of Winchilsea, etc. 3rd Earl of Nottingham, etc.	Edward Finch; 1697–1771	Elizabeth Finch; 1704–1784	William Murray; 1705–1793; 1st Earl of Mansfield (in Nottingham and Middlesex)	Amelia Murray d. 1774	Alexander Lindsay; 1683–1762; 3rd Baronet of Evelick
Barony Mansfield extinct, 1793
Louisa Cathcart; 1758–1843; 2nd Countess of Mansfield (in Nottingham)	David Murray; 1727–1796; 2nd Earl of Mansfield (in Middlesex), 7th Viscount of Stormont, etc., 5th Lord Balvaird	Henrietta Frederica Bünau; 1737–1766	George Finch; 1752–1826; 9th Earl of Winchilsea, etc., 4th Earl of Nottingham, etc.	George Finch-Hatton; 1747–1823	David Lindsay c. 1732–1797; 4th Baronet	John Lindsay; 1737–1788	Margaret Lindsay Ramsay c. 1726–1782
Frederica Markham; 1774–1860	David William Murray; 1777–1840; 3rd Earl of Mansfield (in Middlesex), 8th Viscount of Stormont, etc., 6th Lord Balvaird	Henry Murray; 1784–1860	Elizabeth Murray; 1760–1825	William Lindsay d. 1796	Dido Elizabeth Belle; 1761–1804
Frederica Murray; 1800–1823	James Hamilton Stanhope; 1788–1825	William David Murray; 1806–1898; 4th (in Middlesex, 3rd in Nottingham) Earl of Mansfield, 9th Viscount of Stormont, etc., 7th Lord Balvaird	George William Finch-Hatton; 1791–1858; 10th Earl of Winchilsea, etc., 5th Earl of Nottingham, etc.
James Stanhope; 1821–1904	William Stanhope styled Viscount Stormont	George James Finch-Hatton; 1815–1887; 11th Earl of Winchilsea, etc., 6th Earl of Nottingham, etc.	Murray Edward Gordon Finch-Hatton; 1851–1898; 12th Earl of Winchilsea, etc., 7th Earl of Nottingham, etc.	Henry Stormont Finch-Hatton; 1852–1927; 13th Earl of Winchilsea, etc., 8th Earl of Nottingham, etc.
William Murray; 1860–1906; 5th (in Middlesex, 4th in Nottingham) Earl of Mansfield, 10th Viscount of Stormont, etc., 8th Lord Balvaird	Alan Murray; 1864–1935; 6th (in Middlesex, 5th in Nottingham) Earl of Mansfield, 11th Viscount of Stormont, etc., 9th Lord Balvaird	Guy Montagu George Finch-Hatton; 1885–1939; 14th Earl of Winchilsea, etc., 9th Earl of Nottingham, etc.
Mungo David Malcolm Murray; 1900–1971; 7th (in Middlesex, 6th in Nottingham) Earl of Mansfield, 12th Viscount of Stormont, etc., 10th Lord Balvaird	Christopher Guy Heneage Finch-Hatton; 1911–1950; 15th Earl of Winchilsea, etc., 10th Earl of Nottingham, etc.
William David Mungo James Murray; 1930–2015; 8th (in Middlesex, 7th in Nottingham) Earl of Mansfield, 13th Viscount of Stormont, etc., 11th Lord Balvaird	Christopher Denys Stormonte Finch-Hatton; 1936–1999; 16th Earl of Winchilsea, etc., 11th Earl of Nottingham, etc.
Alexander David Mungo Murray b. 1956; 9th (in Middlesex, 8th in Nottingham) Earl of Mansfield, 14th Viscount of Stormont, etc., 12th Lord Balvaird	Daniel James Hatfield Finch-Hatton b. 1967; 17th Earl of Winchilsea, etc., 12th Earl of Nottingham, etc.

== See also ==
- Earl of Aylesford
- Baron Finch of Fordwich
- Earl of Nottingham
- Viscount Hatton

Baronetage of England
Preceded by Seymour baronets	Finch baronets 29 June 1611	Succeeded by Cope baronets
