= Francis Finch (MP for Eye) =

English lawyer and politician

Francis Finch (born c. 1585) was an English lawyer and politician who sat in the House of Commons between 1624 and 1629.

Finch was the son of Sir Moyle Finch, 1st Baronet of Eastwell, Kent, and his wife Elizabeth Heneage, daughter and heiress of Sir Thomas Heneage. He matriculated at Corpus Christi College, Oxford on 12 June 1601, aged 15. He was called to the bar at Inner Temple in 1614. In 1624, he was elected Member of Parliament for Eye for the Happy Parliament. He was re-elected MP for Eye in 1625, 1626 and 1628 and sat until 1629 when King Charles decided to rule without parliament for eleven years.

Parliament of England
Preceded by Sir Roger North; Sir John Crompton	Member of Parliament for Eye; 1624–1629; With: Sir Henry Crofts 1624; Sir Roger North 1625–1629	Parliament suspended until 1640
