= Thomas Heneage =

16th-century English politician and courtier

Sir Thomas Heneage PC (1532 – 17 October 1595) was an English politician and courtier at the court of Elizabeth I.

== Early and personal life ==
Thomas Heneage the Younger was born at Copt Hall, Epping, Essex, the son of Sir Robert Heneage and Lucy Buckton. Robert and his brother Thomas were members of Henry VIII's Privy Chamber, the latter holding the important office of Groom of the Stool. Thomas Heneage was educated at Queens' College, Cambridge.

In 1554 Heneage married Anne Poyntz, daughter of Sir Nicholas Poyntz and Joan Berkeley. Their only daughter Elizabeth married Sir Moyle Finch, Bt and was created Countess of Winchilsea. Following Anne's death in 1593, he married Mary Browne, Countess of Southampton on 2 May 1594; this marriage was childless.

== Career ==
Heneage was elected Member of Parliament for Stamford in 1553, before sitting for Arundel from 1559. He was then elected for Boston in 1563 but chose to sit for Lincolnshire. He was again returned for Lincolnshire in 1571 and 1572, and for Essex in 1584, 1586, 1589, and 1593.

The Heneage Knot.

He became a courtier under Elizabeth I. He became a Gentleman of the Privy Chamber about 1565 at around that time, she flirted with him, making her favourite, Robert Dudley, 1st Earl of Leicester, jealous. However, Heneage had so far been on good terms with Leicester and the Earl, in his 1587 will, called him "my good old friend". In 1570 he rose to Treasurer of the Queen's Privy Chamber, and was knighted in 1577. In 1586, Heneage was sent by the Queen to the Netherlands. He was to convey to the States General her strong protest of the Earl of Leicester having accepted their offer of the title Governor-General. Heneage read out publicly Elizabeth's letters of disapproval before the Dutch politicians, Leicester, their new Governor General, having to stand nearby. He became Vice-Chamberlain of the Household and was sworn of the Privy Council of England in 1587, before being appointed Chancellor of the Duchy of Lancaster in 1590.

He was also a friend of Francis Walsingham and a colleague of Sir Christopher Hatton acting as an intermediary between the Queen and Hatton regarding rivalry between Hatton and Sir Walter Raleigh for the Queen's affections.

Heneage died on 17 October 1595 and was buried in Old St Paul's Cathedral. His grave and monument were destroyed in the Great Fire of London in 1666. A modern monument in the crypt of the rebuilt cathedral lists him as one of the important graves lost.

== Sources ==
- Deacon. M. p32 etc.

Political offices
Preceded by Sir Christopher Hatton	Vice-Chamberlain of the Household; 1587–1595	Unknown Title next held by Sir John Stanhope
Preceded by Sir Francis Walsingham	Chancellor of the Duchy of Lancaster; 1590–1595	In commission Title next held by Sir Robert Cecil
