= Gosfield Hall =

Grade I listed country house in Gosfield, Essex

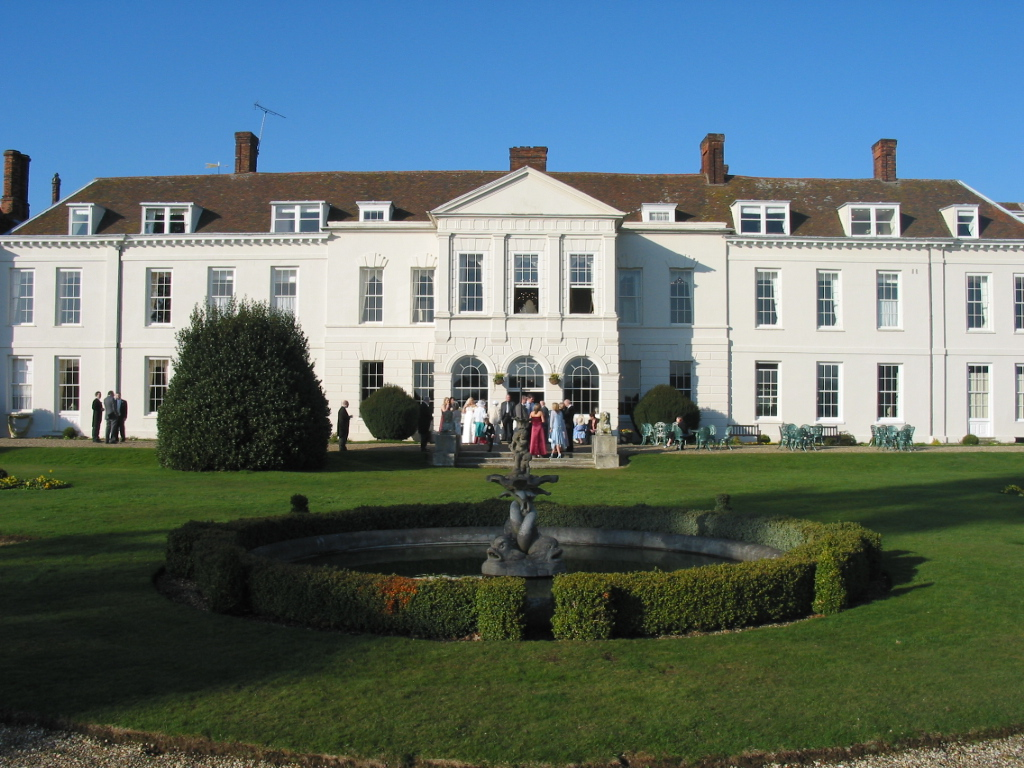
- Gosfield Hall

- Location within Essex
- 51°56′15″N 0°34′50″E
- Location: Gosfield

Site notes
- Area: Essex

Listed Building – Grade I
- Official name: Gosfield Hall
- Designated: 1 March 1960
- Reference no.: 1122938

Gosfield Hall is a country house in Gosfield, near Braintree in Essex, England. It is a Grade I listed building.

== House ==
The house was built in 1545 by Sir John Wentworth, a member of Cardinal Wolsey’s household, and hosted royal visits by Queen Elizabeth I and her grand retinue throughout the middle of the 16th century. John Wentworth, High Sheriff of Essex, who died in 1613, left "a splendid inheritance" to his eldest son, Sir John Wentworth, 1st Baronet, who ruined the family through extravagance.

Sir Thomas Millington was in residence by 1691. He reconstructed the Grand Salon which remained the state banqueting hall for a long time. During the same period he had guest rooms built above the Salon. His crest, a double-headed eagle, may be seen above the central doors on the courtyard side.

The mansion was built round a central courtyard, and the west front still has a fine Tudor façade. The east front was remodelled by John Knight after he came into possession in 1715 and again later in the 18th century for Earl Nugent (1702–1788), who also remodelled the south front and created the mile-long lake. The magnificent ballroom was added and the deer park landscaped for the property to become a family home for his son-in-law the Marquis of Buckingham (1753–1813).

Later during the French Revolution, Gosfield Hall became the home of the Comte de Provence, the future King Louis XVIII, and his wife Marie-Josephine-Louise of Savoy who had fled France to live in exile in grand style, with more than 350 courtiers and staff in attendance from 1807 to 1809.

Much restoration work was done by Samuel Courtauld who owned the house between 1854 and 1881. In the early 20th century the house was virtually abandoned, but it was used as a base for troops during the Second World War.

More recently, the Hall was owned by the Country Houses Association until it went into liquidation in 2003.

It is operated as a wedding venue.

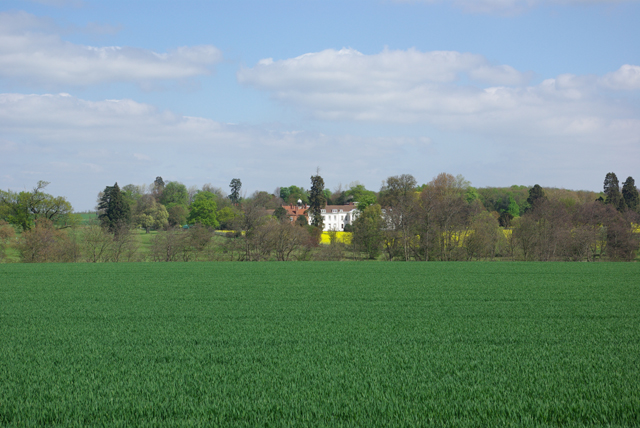
