= St Mary's Church, Eastwell =

Coordinates: 51.1900°N 0.8745°E

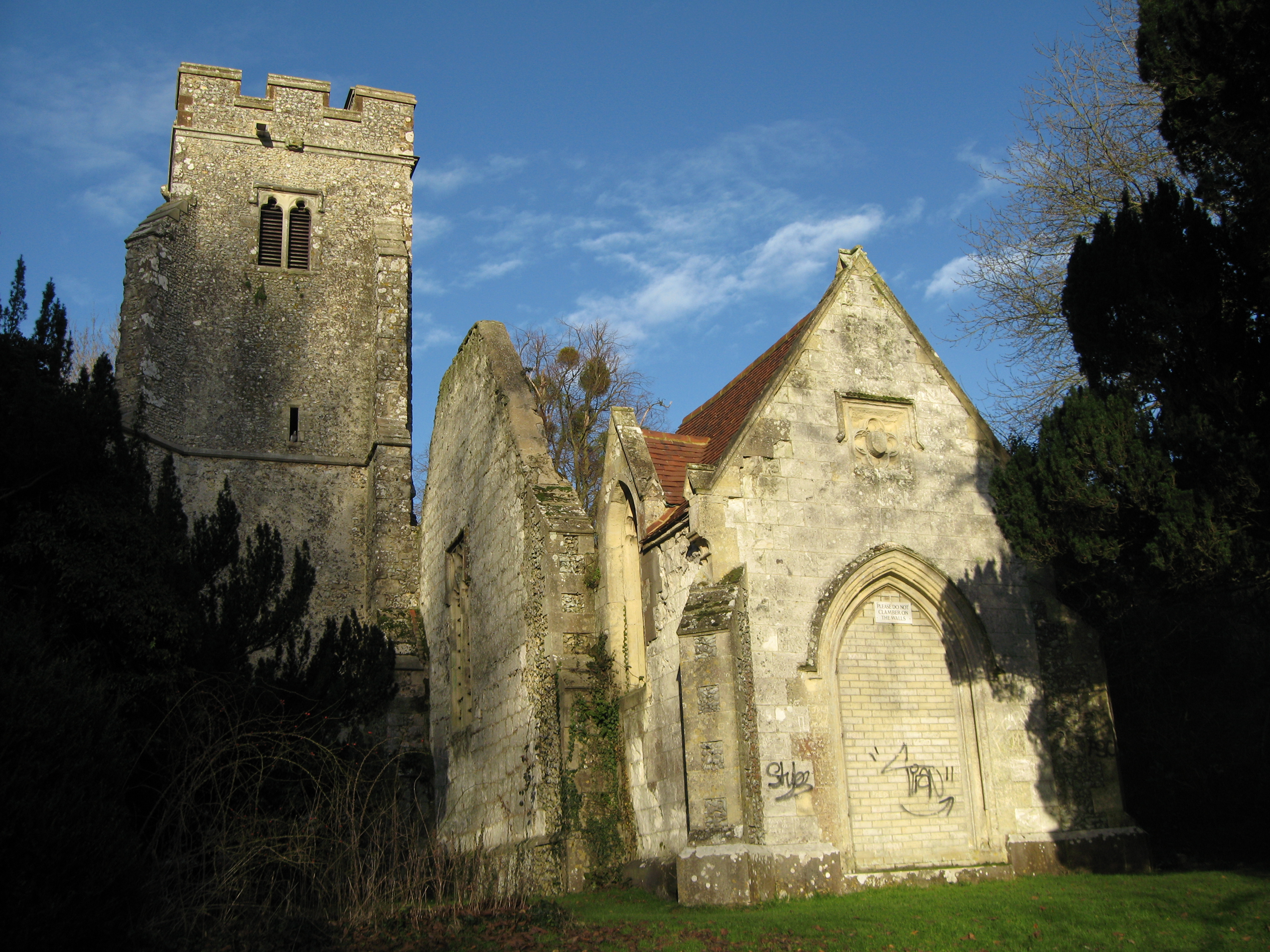
- The ruins of St Mary's Church, Eastwell

- Location in Kent
- OS grid reference: TR 010 473
- Location: Eastwell, Kent
- Country: England
- Denomination: Anglican
- Website: Friends of Friendless Churches

Architecture
- Functional status: Ruin
- Heritage designation: Grade II
- Designated: 27 November 1957
- Architectural type: Church
- Style: Gothic
- Groundbreaking: 15th century
- Completed: 19th century

Specifications
- Materials: Tower flint, chapel chalk

St Mary's Church is a ruined former Church of England parish church, in the grounds of Eastwell Park in the hamlet of Eastwell, Kent, England. It is recorded in the National Heritage List for England as a designated Grade II listed building, and is a Scheduled monument. The ruins have been in the care of the Friends of Friendless Churches charity since they took over the freehold on 20 March 1980.

== History ==
In 1951 the roof of the nave collapsed, destroying the arcade, and the remaining shell of the church was demolished in 1956, leaving only the footings, the tower, and the 19th-century mortuary chapel.

== Architecture ==
All that now remains are the tower and the wall of the south aisle, dating from the 15th century, and a mortuary chapel from the 19th century. The ruins of the tower and aisle wall are constructed in flint and plaster with stone quoins. The tower is supported by three-stage buttresses and it has a doorway with a string course above. In the tower is a two-light Perpendicular window. The bell openings date from the 18th century and they also have two lights. The summit of the tower is battlemented. On the lower stage of the tower is a mutilated consecration cross in knapped flint. The blocked arch to the former nave has octagonal piers. In the aisle wall are two two-light windows. The chapel is constructed in chalk with a tiled roof. It has lancet windows and its interior is vaulted.

In the former chancel of the church is a memorial to Richard Plantagenet (Richard of Eastwell), who is rumoured to have been the son of Richard III.

== Monuments ==
The internal fittings and monuments have all been removed and most of the latter are in the care of the Victoria and Albert Museum. These include monuments to Thomas Moyle (d. 1560) and his wife Katherine (d. after 1560); and Sir Moyle Finch, 1st Baronet (d. 1614) and Elizabeth Finch, 1st Countess of Winchilsea (d. 1634).

Pews were taken to nearby Wye College and placed within the chapel there.

== Churchyard ==
George Finch-Hatton, 11th Earl of Winchilsea (1815–1887), his second wife Lady Elizabeth Georgiana (d. 1904, daughter of Francis Conyngham, 2nd Marquess Conyngham) as well as his only son George William Finch-Hatton, Viscount Maidstone (1852–1879) are buried in a simple grave in the overgrown part of the church cemetery.
