= Anne Finch, Countess of Winchilsea =

British countess and poet

Anne Finch
- Countess of Winchilsea
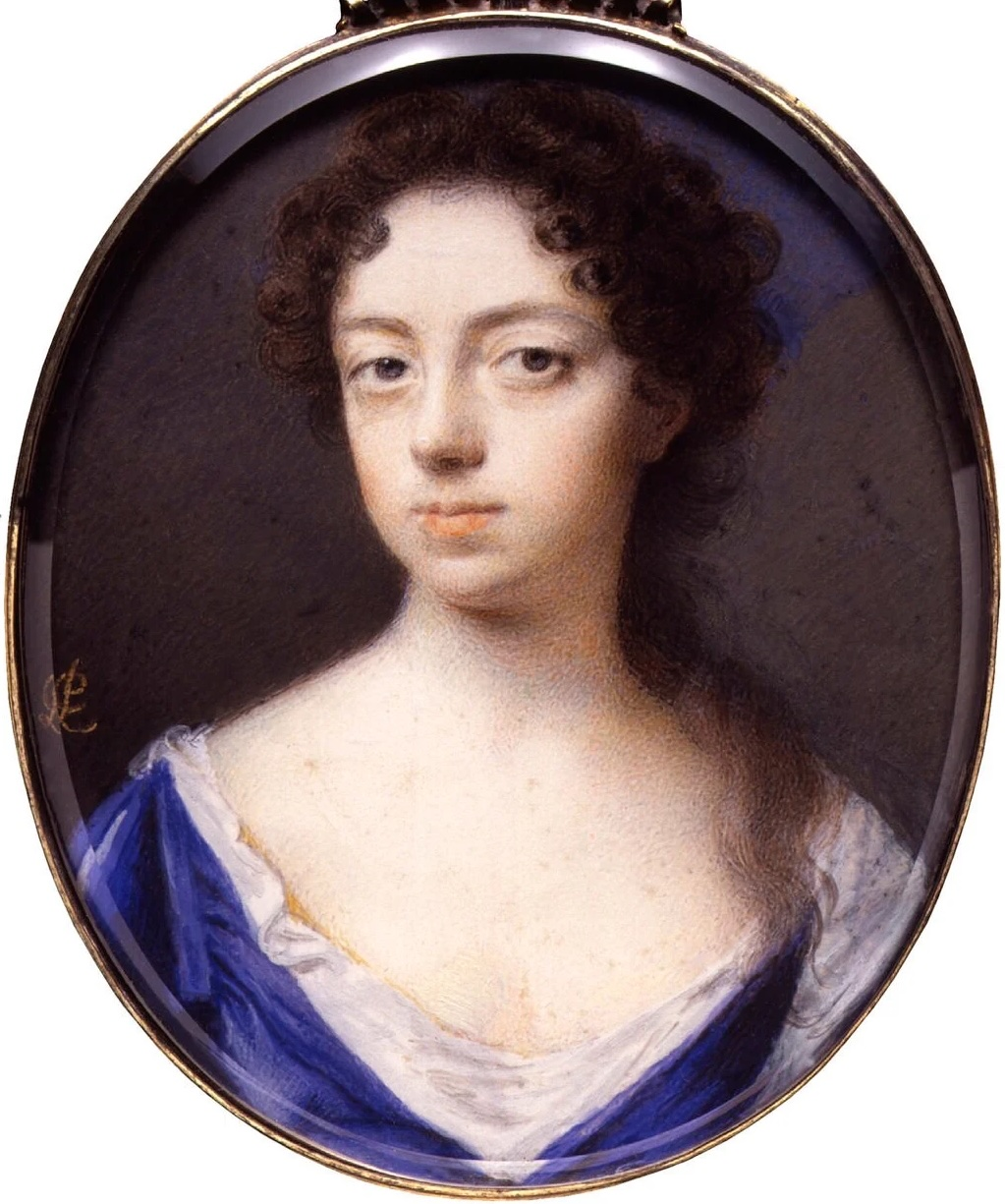
- Portrait miniature by Peter Cross (c. 1690–1700)
- Born: April 1661; Sydmonton, Hampshire, England
- Died: 5 August 1720 (aged 59); Westminster, London, England
- Spouse: Heneage Finch, 5th Earl of Winchilsea
- Parents: Sir William Kingsmill; Anne Haslewood
- Occupation: Poet and courtier

Anne Finch, Countess of Winchilsea (née Kingsmill; April 1661 – 5 August 1720), was an English poet and courtier. Finch wrote in many genres and on many topics - including fables, odes, songs, and religious verse - which are informed by "political ideology, religious orientation, and aesthetic sensibility". Her works also allude to other female authors of the time, such as Aphra Behn and Katherine Phillips. Through her commentary on the mental and spiritual equality of the sexes and the importance of women fulfilling their potential as a moral duty to themselves and to society, she is regarded as one of the integral female poets of the Augustan Era. Finch died in Westminster in 1720 and was buried at her home at Eastwell, Kent.

== Biography ==
=== Early years ===
Finch was born Anne Kingsmill in April 1661 in Sydmonton, Hampshire, in southern England. Her parents were Sir William Kingsmill and Anne Haslewood, both from old and powerful families. She was the youngest of three children, her siblings being William and Bridget Kingsmill. Anne never knew her father, as he died only five months after she was born. In his will, he specified that his daughters receive financial support equal to that of their brother for their education, which was unusual for the times.

Her mother remarried in 1662, to Sir Thomas Ogle, and later bore Anne Kingsmill's half-sister, Dorothy Ogle. Anne would remain close to Dorothy for most of their lives, with Dorothy inspiring poems such as "Some Reflections: In a Dialogue Between Teresa and Ardelia" and "To my Sister Ogle".

Finch's mother died in 1664. Shortly before her death she wrote a will giving control of her estate to her second husband. The will was successfully challenged in a Court of Chancery by Anne Kingsmill's uncle, William Haslewood. Subsequently, Anne and Bridget Kingsmill lived with their grandmother, Lady Kingsmill, in Charing Cross, London, while their brother lived with his uncle William Haslewood.

In 1670, Lady Kingsmill filed her own Court of Chancery suit, demanding from William Haslewood a share in the educational and support monies for Anne and Bridget. The court split custody and financial support between Haslewood and Lady Kingsmill. When Lady Kingsmill died in 1672, Anne and Bridget rejoined their brother to be raised by Haslewood. The sisters received a comprehensive and progressive education, something that was uncommon for girls at the time, and Anne Kingsmill learned about Greek and Roman mythology, the Bible, French and Italian languages, history, poetry, and drama.

=== At the court of Charles II ===
The sisters remained in the Haslewood household until their uncle's death in 1682. 21 years old at the time, Anne Kingsmill then went to live at St James's Palace, joining the court of Charles II. She became one of six maids of honour to Mary of Modena (wife of James, Duke of York, who later became James II)

Apparently, Anne's interest in poetry began at the palace, and she started writing her own verse. Her friends included Sarah Churchill and Anne Killigrew, two other maids of honour who also shared poetic interests. However, when Anne Kingsmill witnessed the derision within the court that greeted Killigrew's poetic efforts (poetry was not a pursuit considered suitable for women), she decided to keep her own writing attempts to herself and her close friends. She remained secretive about her poetry until much later in her life, when she was encouraged to publish under her own name.

==== Marriage ====
While residing at court, Anne Kingsmill met Colonel Heneage Finch, whom she married on 15 May 1684. Colonel Finch, a courtier as well as a soldier, had been appointed Groom of the Bedchamber to James, Duke of York, in 1683. His family had strong Royalist connections, as well as a pronounced loyalty to the Stuart dynasty, and his grandmother Elizabeth Finch had become the 1st Countess of Winchilsea in 1628. Finch met Kingsmill and fell in love with her, but she at first resisted his romantic overtures. However, Finch proved a persistent suitor, and the couple was finally married on 15 May 1684.

Upon her marriage, Anne Finch resigned her court position, but her husband retained his own appointment and would serve in various government positions. As such, the couple remained involved in court life. During the 1685 coronation of James II, Heneage Finch carried the canopy of the Queen, Mary of Modena, who had specifically requested his service.

The couple's marriage proved to be enduring and happy, in part due to the aspects of equality in their partnership. Indeed, part of the development of her poetic skills was brought about by expressing her joy in her love for her husband and the positive effects of his lack of patriarchal impingement on her artistic development. These early works, many written to her husband (such as "A Letter to Dafnis: April 2d 1685"), celebrated their relationship and ardent intimacy. In expressing herself in such a fashion, Anne Finch quietly defied contemporary social conventions. In other early works she aimed a satiric disapproval at prevailing misogynistic attitudes. Still, her husband strongly supported her writing activities.

Despite their court connections, Anne and Heneage Finch led a rather sedate life. At first they lived in Westminster; then, as Heneage Finch became more involved in public affairs, they moved to London. His involvement had increased when James II took the throne in 1685. The couple demonstrated great loyalty to the king in what turned out to be a brief reign.

=== Refusal to take Oath of Allegiance to King William ===
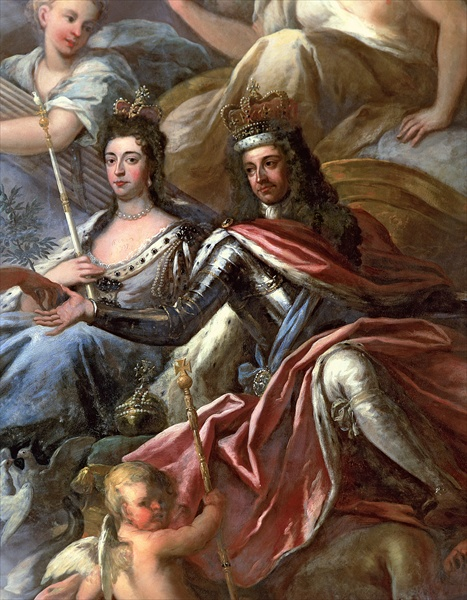
William and Mary

James II was deposed in 1688 during the "Bloodless Revolution". During his short reign, James fell under intense criticism for his autocratic manner of rule. Eventually, he fled England for exile in Saint-Germain, France. As a result, the British Parliament offered William of Orange the English crown. When the new monarchs, William and Mary, assumed the throne, oaths of allegiance became a requirement for both the public and the clergy. William and Mary were Protestants, and the Finches remained loyal to the Catholic Stuart court, refusing to take the oath. They also viewed their oaths to the previous monarchy as morally binding and constant. But such a stance invited trouble. Heneage Finch lost his government position and retreated from public life. As the loss of his position entailed a loss of income, the Finches were forced to live with friends in London for a period. While living in the city the couple faced harassment, fines and potential imprisonment.

In April 1690, Heneage Finch was arrested and charged with Jacobitism for attempting to join the exiled James II in France. It was a difficult time for Jacobites and Nonjurors (those who had refused to take the oath of allegiance, such as the Finches), as their arrests and punishments were abusive. Because of his arrest, Heneage and Anne Finch remained separated from April until November of that year. The circumstances caused the couple a great deal of emotional turmoil. Living with friends in Kent while her husband prepared his defence in London, Anne Finch often succumbed to bouts of depression, something that afflicted her for most of her adult life. The poems that she wrote during this period, such as "Ardelia to Melancholy," reflected her mental state. Other poems involved political themes. Her work during this period was less playful and joyous than her earlier output.

=== Move to country estate ===
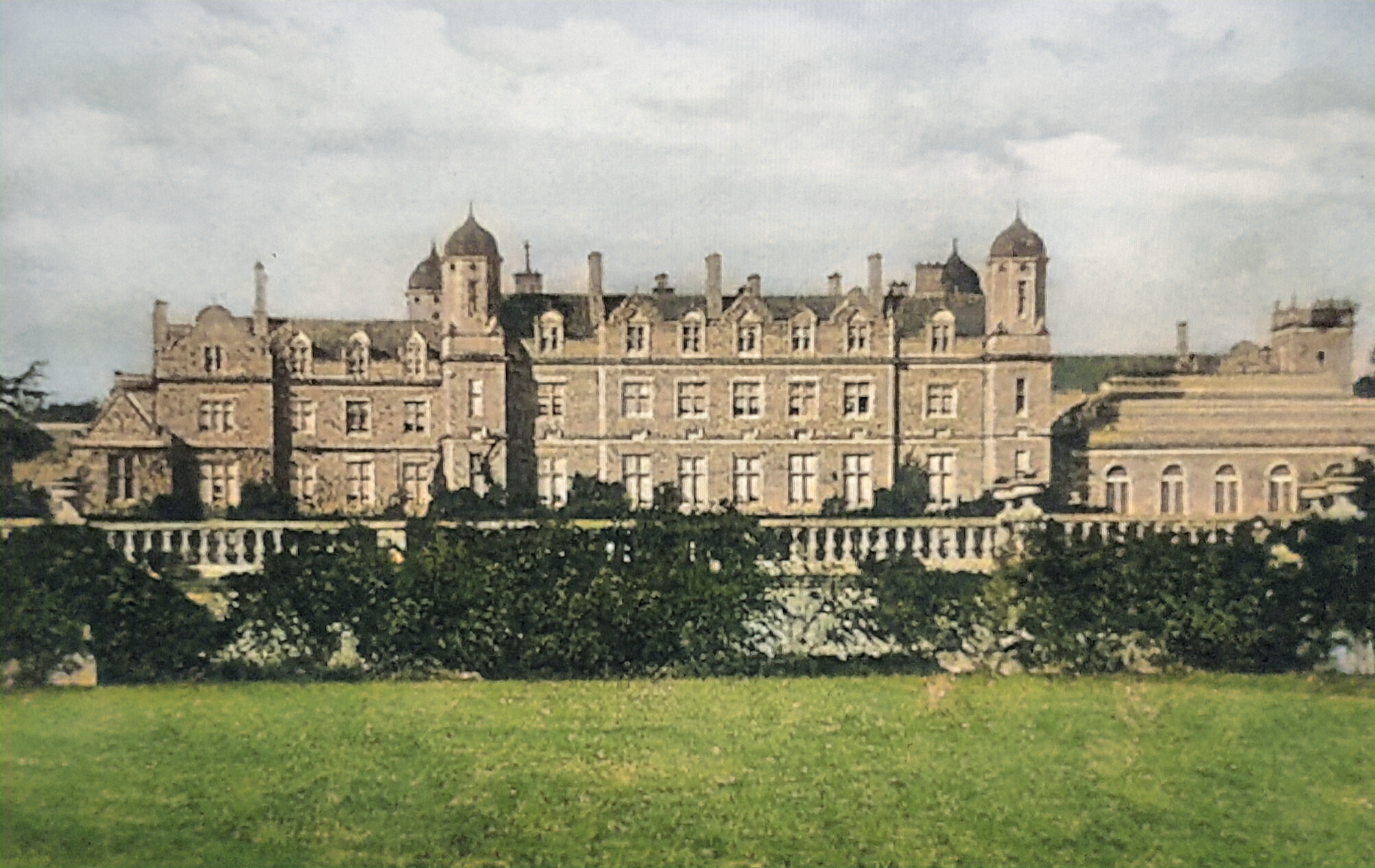
Eastwell Park, where Finch lived from 1690

After Heneage Finch was released and his case dismissed, his nephew Charles Finch, 4th Earl of Winchelsea, invited the couple to permanently move into the family's Eastwell Park, Kent, estate. The Finches took up residence in late 1690 and found peace and security on the estate, where they would live for more than 25 years in the quiet countryside.

For Anne Finch, the estate provided a fertile and supportive environment for her literary efforts. Charles Finch was a patron of the arts and, along with Heneage Finch, he encouraged Anne's writing. Her husband's support was practical. He began collecting a portfolio of her 56 poems, writing them out by hand and making corrective changes. One significant change involved Anne's pen name, which Heneage changed from "Areta" to "Ardelia".

The peace and seclusion at Eastwell fostered the development of Finch's poetry, and the retirement in the country provided her with her most productive writing period. Her work revealed her growing knowledge of contemporary poetic conventions, and the themes she addressed included metaphysics, the beauty of nature (as expressed in "A Nocturnal Reverie"), and the value of friendship (as in "The Petition for an Absolute Retreat").

=== Return to public life ===
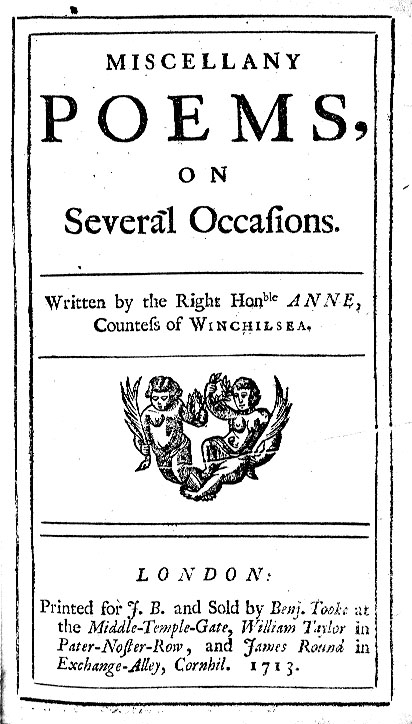
Title page of Miscellany Poems, on Several Occasions, published in 1713.

By the early 18th century, the political climate in England had generally improved for the Finches. King William died in 1702, and his death was followed by the succession to the throne of Queen Anne, the daughter of James II, who had died in 1701. With these developments, the Finches felt ready to embrace a more public lifestyle. Heneage Finch ran for a parliamentary seat three times (in 1701, 1705, and 1710), but was never elected. Still, the Finches felt the time was right to leave the seclusion of the country life and move into a house in London.

In London, Anne Finch was encouraged to publish her poetry under her own name. Earlier, in 1691, she had anonymously published some of her poetry. In 1701 she published "The Spleen" anonymously in A New Miscellany of Original Poems, on Several Occasions. This well-received reflection on depression would prove to be the most popular of her poems in her lifetime. When the Finches returned to London, Anne acquired some important and influential friends, including renowned writers such as Jonathan Swift, Nicholas Rowe, and Alexander Pope, who encouraged her to write and publish much more openly. For instance, Swift's poem "Apollo Outwitted" depicts the angry god condemning Finch to a life "negligent of fame," which playfully suggests that her modesty is a curse.

Finch was reluctant, as she felt the current social and political climate remained oppressive of women. (In her poem "The Introduction," which was privately circulated, she reflected on contemporary attitudes toward female poets.) When she published Miscellany Poems, on Several Occasions in 1713, the cover page of the first printing indicated that the collected works (which included 86 poems as well as a play) were "Written by a Lady." However, on subsequent printings, Finch (as Anne, Countess of Winchilsea) received credit as the author.

=== Lady Winchilsea ===
Anne Finch became Countess of Winchilsea upon the sudden and unexpected death of Charles Finch on 4 August 1712. As Charles Finch had no children, his uncle Heneage Finch became the Earl of Winchilsea, making Anne the Countess. The Finches also assumed Charles Finch's financial and legal burdens. The issues were eventually settled in the Finches' favour in 1720, but not before the couple had endured nearly seven years of emotional strain.

During this period, Heneage and Anne Finch faced renewed strains resulting from court politics. When Queen Anne died in 1714, she was succeeded by George I. Subsequently, a Whig government, which was hostile to the Jacobite cause, rose to power. The Jacobite rebellion, which took place in Scotland in 1715, further aggravated the tense political situation. The Finches became greatly concerned about their safety, especially after a friend, Matthew Prior, who shared their political sympathies, was sent to prison.

=== Deteriorating health ===
All of her worries took a toll on Anne Finch's health, which had begun to deteriorate. For years she had been vulnerable to depression, and in 1715 she became seriously ill. Her later poems reflected her turmoil. In particular, "A Suplication for the joys of Heaven" and "A Contemplation" expressed her concerns about her life and political and spiritual beliefs.

Finch died in 1720 in Westminster, London, and her body was returned to Eastwell for burial, according to her previously stated wishes. Her husband produced an obituary that praised her talents as a writer and her virtues as an individual. A portion of it read, "To draw her Ladyship's just Character, requires a masterly Pen like her own (She being a fine Writer, and an excellent Poet); we shall only presume to say, she was the most faithful Servant to her Royall Mistresse, the best Wife to her Noble Lord, and in every other Relation, publick and private, so illustrious an Example of such extraordinary Endowments, both of Body and Mind, that the Court of England never bred a more accomplished Lady, nor the Church of England a better Christian."

Her husband died on 30 September 1726.

== Poetry rediscovered ==
The only major collection of Anne Finch's writings that appeared in her lifetime was Miscellany Poems, on Several Occasions. Nearly a century after her death, her poetic output had been largely forgotten, until the great English poet William Wordsworth praised her nature poetry in an essay included in his 1815 volume Lyrical Ballads.

A major collection titled The Poems of Anne, Countess of Winchilsea, edited by Myra Reynolds, was published in 1903. For many years, it was considered the definitive collection of her writings. It remains the only scholarly collection of Finch's poetry, and includes all of the poems from Miscellany Poems and poems retrieved from manuscripts. Reynolds's introduction did as much to re-establish Finch's reputation as Wordsworth's previous praise.

Later, The Wellesley Manuscript, which contained 53 unpublished poems, was released. Literary scholars have noted Finch's distinctive voice and her poems' intimacy, sincerity, and spirituality. They also expressed appreciation for her experimentation as well as her assured usage of Augustan diction and forms.

According to James Winn, Anne Finch is the librettist of Venus and Adonis, with music by John Blow; the work is considered by some scholars to be the first true opera in the English language. In his critical edition of the opera for the Purcell Society, Bruce Wood agrees with Winn. However, the recent Cambridge Edition of the Works of Anne Finch contends, "Because her authorship is not established, to consider Finch's desire for anonymity is an act of historical imagination and cannot be used as evidence for her authorship."

In 1929, Virginia Woolf, in her classic essay A Room of One's Own, both critiques Finch's writing and expresses great admiration for it. In Woolf's examination of the "female voice" and her search for the history of female writers, she argues that Finch's writing is "harassed and distracted with hates and grievances," pointing out that to Finch "men are hated and feared, because they have the power to bar her way to what she wants to do—which is to write." However, Woolf excuses the flaws she perceives in Finch's work by claiming that Finch surely had to "encourage herself to write by supposing that what she writes will never be published." She goes on to acknowledge that in Finch's work, "Now and again words issue of pure poetry…It was a thousand pities that the woman who could write like that, whose mind was turned to nature, and reflection, should have been forced to anger and bitterness." Woolf goes on in defence of her as a gifted but sometimes understandably misguided example of women's writing. It is evident that Woolf sympathises deeply with Finch's plight as a female poet, and though she takes issue with some of the content in Finch's writing, she expresses grief that Finch is so unknown: "…when one comes to seek out the facts about Lady Winchilsea, one finds, as usual, that almost nothing is known about her." Woolf wishes to know more about "this melancholy lady, who loved wandering in the fields and thinking about unusual things and scorned, so rashly, so unwisely, 'the dull manage of a servile house.'"

== Works ==
=== Themes ===
As a poet, Finch attained a modest amount of notoriety during her lifetime. In extension to her lyric poetry, odes, love poetry and prose poetry work, Finch's writing was considered to have fallen into the Augustan period (approximately 1660–1760). This is largely due to her work reflecting upon nature and finding both an emotional and religious relationship to it in her verse, consequentially commenting on the change in philosophical and political policy of the time. Later, literary critics recognized the diversity of her poetic output as well as its personal and intimate style. This style would earn greater attention after her death.

==== The Introduction ====
In her works, Finch drew upon her own observations and experiences, demonstrating an insightful awareness of the social mores and political climate of her era. But she also artfully recorded her private thoughts, which could be joyful or despairing, playful or despondent. The poems also revealed her highly developed spiritual side.

Did I, my lines intend for public view,
How many censures, would their faults pursue,
Some would, because such words they do affect,
Cry they’re insipid, empty, and uncorrect.
And many have attained, dull and untaught,
The name of wit only by finding fault.
True judges might condemn their want of wit,

— Finch, The Introduction

==== The Spleen ====
Finch experimented with the poetic traditions of her day, often straying from the fold through her use of rhyme, metre and content, which ranged from the simplistic to the metaphysical. Finch also wrote several satiric vignettes modelled after the short tales of French fabulist Jean de La Fontaine. She mocked La Fontaine's fables, offering social criticism through biting sarcasm. Finch's more melancholy fare, however, gained her wider acclaim. Her famous poems in this sullen vein include A Nocturnal Reverie and Ardelia to Melancholy, both depicting severe depression. Finch also skilfully employed the Pindaric ode, exploring complex and irregular structures and rhyme schemes. Her most famous example of this technique is in The Spleen (written in stanzas after Cowley's manner, and first published in Charles Gildon's Miscellany of 1701), a poetic expression of her first-hand experience of depression and its effects – a condition that was popularly associated with the spleen:

What art thou, Spleen, which ev'ry thing dost ape?
Thou Proteus to abused mankind,
Who never yet thy real cause could find,
Or fix thee to remain in one continued shape.
Still varying thy perplexing form,
Now a Dead Sea thou'lt represent,
A calm of stupid discontent,
Then, dashing on the rocks wilt rage into a storm.
Trembling sometimes thou dost appear,
Dissolved into a panic fear;

— Finch, The Spleen

This poem was first published anonymously, though it went on to become one of her most renowned pieces. Virginia Woolf said of Finch, "a thousand pities that [her mind] should have been forced to [such] anger and bitterness".

One of her poems was set to music by Purcell.

== Selected works ==
=== Writings by the author ===
- Upon the Death of King James the Second, anonymous (London, 1701).
- The Tunbridge Prodigy (London: Printed & sold by John Morphew, 1706).
- The Spleen, A Pindarique Ode. By a Lady (London: Printed & sold by H. Hills, 1709).
- Free-thinkers: A Poem in Dialogue (London, 1711).
- Miscellany Poems, on Several Occasions. Written by a Lady (London: Printed for John Barber & sold by Benj. Tooke, William Taylor & James Round, 1713).

=== Editions and collections ===
- The Poems of Anne Countess of Winchilsea, edited by Myra Reynolds (Chicago: University of Chicago Press, 1903).
- Selected Poems of Anne Finch, Countess of Winchilsea (Hull, Que.: Orinda, 1906).
- Poems, by Anne, Countess of Winchilsea, compiled by John Middleton Murry (London: Cape, 1928).
- Selected Poems, edited by Katharine M. Rogers (New York: Ungar, 1979).
- Selected Poems, edited by Denys Thompson (Manchester: Carcanet Press, 1987; New York: Fyfield, 1987).
- The Wellesley Manuscript Poems of Anne Countess of Winchilsea, edited by Jean M. Ellis D'Alessandro (Florence: Universita degli Studi di Firenze, 1988).
- The Anne Finch Digital Archive, edited by Jennifer Keith.The Anne Finch Digital Archive
- The Cambridge Edition of the Works of Anne Finch, Countess of Winchilsea, edited by Jennifer Keith, et al., 2 volumes (Cambridge, UK: Cambridge University Press, 2020–2021). Cambridge UP website information

=== List of poems ===
- Adam Posed
- The Answer
- Friendship between Ephelia and Ardelia
- The Introduction
- A Letter to Daphnis
- A Nocturnal Reverie
- On Myself
- A Song
- The Spleen
- To Death
- To the Nightingale
- The Tree
