= Eastwell, Kent =

Hamlet in Kent, England

Coordinates: 51.1934°N 0.8713°E

Eastwell
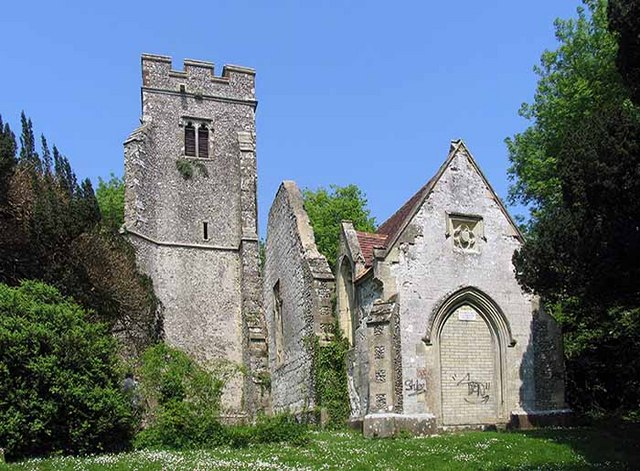
- Ruin of St Mary's parish church

- Location within Kent
- Area: 3.62 km^{2} (1.40 sq mi)
- Population: 103 (2011 Census)
  - Density: 28/km^{2} (73/sq mi)
- OS grid reference: TR009473
- District: Ashford
- Shire county: Kent
- Region: South East
- Country: England
- Sovereign state: United Kingdom
- Post town: Ashford
- Postcode district: TN25
- Dialling code: 01233
- Police: Kent
- Fire: Kent
- Ambulance: South East Coast
- UK Parliament: Weald of Kent
- Website: Boughton Aluph and Eastwell Parish Council

Eastwell is a hamlet and civil parish about 3 miles (5 km) north of Ashford, Kent, England. The 2011 Census recorded the parish's population as 103. Eastwell shares a grouped parish council with the neighbouring parish of Boughton Aluph.

== Parish church ==
Much of the medieval parish church of St Mary collapsed in 1951, and most of the ruins were demolished in 1956. Only the 15th-century west tower, the west wall of the south aisle and a 19th-century mortuary chapel remain standing. Since 1980 the remains have been a Scheduled Ancient Monument and cared for by the Friends of Friendless Churches charity.

== Eastwell Park ==
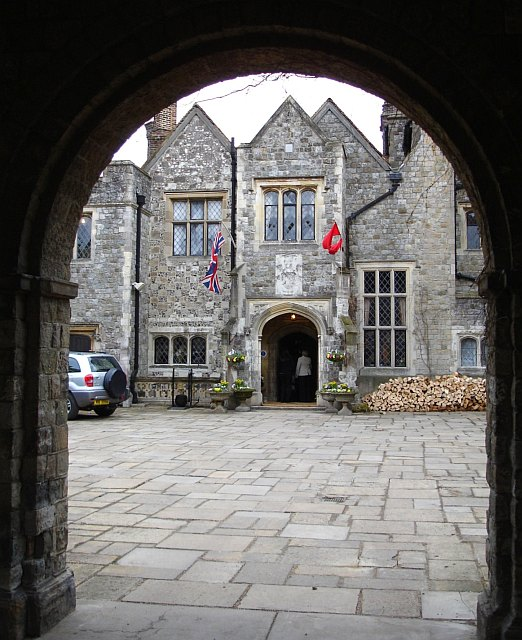
Part of Eastwell Manor house

Eastwell Park is a country estate almost one square mile in area surrounding Eastwell Manor, a 20th century Jacobethan country house rebuilt from the previous house and completed in 1928. Eastwell Lake was created at the same time. The hotel offers a golf course, indoor swimming pool and horseriding.

Contemporary with the house is Eastwell Towers, a Jacobethan gatehouse in the adjacent parish of Boughton Aluph. The drive from the gatehouse to the manor house is about 1 mile (1.6 km) long.

== Lake House ==
Lake House is a late 13th-century house in Eastwell Park south of the manor house. It has a 17th-century roof and 19th-century windows, but retains four original windows, now blocked. It is a Grade II* listed building.

== Governance ==
There are three tiers of local government covering Eastwell, at parish, district and county level: Boughton Aluph and Eastwell Parish Council, Ashford Borough Council, and Kent County Council. The parish council is a grouped parish council, covering the two parishes of Eastwell and Boughton Aluph. It meets at the village hall in Boughton Lees, known as the Iron Room.

== Notable inhabitants ==
By date of birth:

- Richard Plantagenet (Richard of Eastwell) (1469–1550), purported son of King Richard III
- Sir Thomas Moyle (1488–1560), Speaker of the House of Commons
- Anne Finch, Countess of Winchilsea (1661–1720), poet and courtier
- George Finch-Hatton, 11th Earl of Winchilsea (1815–1887), politician, and his family
- Prince Alfred of Great Britain, Duke of Edinburgh (1866–1900), and his family

== See also ==
- Listed buildings in Eastwell, Kent
