= Listed buildings in Eastwell, Kent =

Historic structures in Kent, England

Eastwell is a village and civil parish in the Borough of Ashford of Kent, England. It contains one grade II* and four grade II listed buildings that are recorded in the National Heritage List for England.

This list is based on the information retrieved online from Historic England.

== Key ==
Grade	Criteria
I	Buildings that are of exceptional interest
II*	Particularly important buildings of more than special interest
II	Buildings that are of special interest

== Listing ==
Name	Grade	Location	Type	Completed (Note: The date given is the date used by Historic England as significant for the initial building or that of an important part in the structure's description.)	Date designated	Grid ref. (Note: The grid reference is based on the British national grid reference system, sometimes known as OSGB36, used by the Ordnance Survey.) Geo-coordinates	Notes	Entry number (Note: The "List Entry Number" is a unique number assigned to each listed building and scheduled monument by Historic England.)	Image	Wikidata
Eastwell Manor and Courtyard Gateways	II				27 November 1957	TR0167247568; 51°11′30″N 0°53′05″E		1299575	Eastwell Manor and Courtyard Gateways More images	Q2540442
Lake House	II*				13 October 1952	TR0101347326; 51°11′23″N 0°52′31″E		1362760	Lake House More images	Q17556910
Church of St Mary, Ruins	II	Ruins			27 November 1957	TR0096447349; 51°11′24″N 0°52′28″E		1071264	Church of St Mary, Ruins More images	Q7594320
Sandpit Cottages	II	Sandyhurst Lane			13 August 1984	TR0045845776; 51°10′34″N 0°51′59″E		1071265	Upload Photo	Q26326331
Church of St Christopher	II	The Green, Boughton Lees			13 August 1984	TR0209647099; 51°11′15″N 0°53′26″E		1185700	Church of St Christopher More images	Q7401104

== See also ==
- Grade I listed buildings in Kent
- Grade II* listed buildings in Kent

== Sources ==
- Newman, John (2012) [1969], Kent: West and the Weald, The Buildings of England, New Haven and London: Yale University Press, ISBN 978-0-300-18509-6
