= Richard of Eastwell =

Reputed illegitimate son of Richard III of England (c. 1469–1550)

- Born: c. 1469
- Died: 22 December 1550 (aged 80–81)
- Occupation: Bricklayer
- Father: Richard III (claimed)

Richard Plantagenet or Richard of Eastwell (? 1469 – 22 December 1550) was a reclusive bricklayer who was claimed to be a son of Richard III, the last Plantagenet King of England.

== Life ==
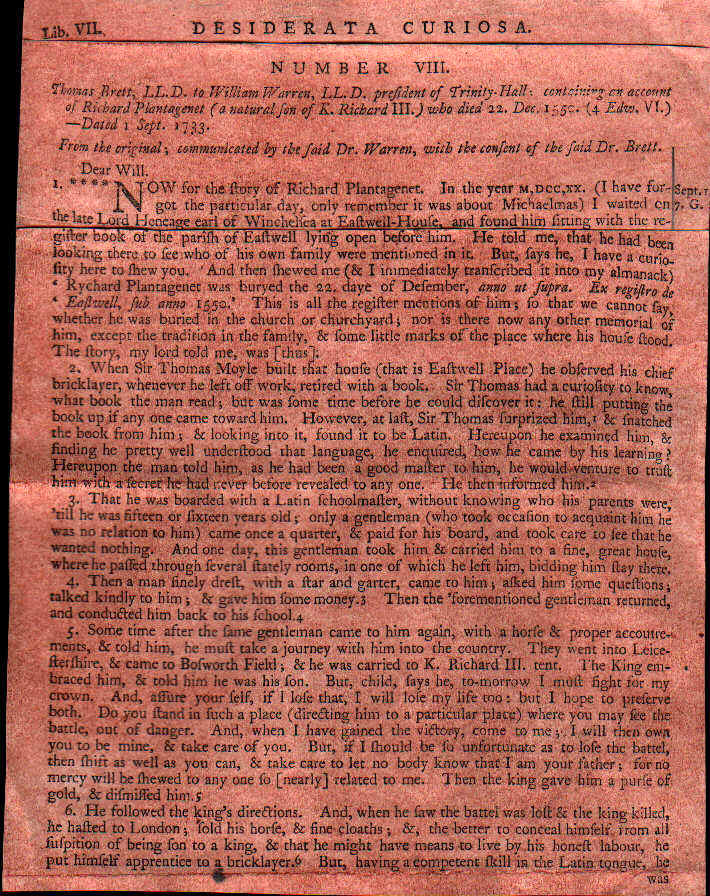
First page of the source document for this article

According to Francis Peck's Desiderata Curiosa (a two-volume miscellany published 1732–1735), Richard boarded with a Latin schoolmaster until he was 15 or 16. He did not know who his real parents were, but was visited four times a year by a mysterious gentleman who paid for his upkeep. This person once took him to a "fine, great house" where Richard met a man in a "star and garter" who treated him kindly. At the age of 16, the gentleman took the boy to see King Richard III at his encampment just before the battle of Bosworth. The King informed the boy that he was his son, and told him to watch the battle from a safe vantage point. The king told the boy that, if he won, he would acknowledge him as his son. If he lost, he told the boy to forever conceal his identity. King Richard was killed in the battle, and the boy fled to London. He was apprenticed to a bricklayer, but kept up the Latin he had learned by reading during his work.

Around 1546 the bricklayer, by then a very old man, was working on Eastwell Place for Sir Thomas Moyle. Moyle discovered Richard reading and, having been told his story, offered him stewardship of the house's kitchens. Richard was used to seclusion and declined the offer. Instead, he asked to build a one-room house on Moyle's estate and live there until he died. This request was granted. A building called "Plantagenet Cottage" still stands on the site of the original.

It has been suggested this Richard Plantagenet could have been Richard, Duke of York, one of the missing Princes in the Tower.

== Re-discovery ==
The record of Richard's burial was re-discovered in the parish registers around Michaelmas 1720. Heneage Finch, 5th Earl of Winchilsea, came across it when researching his own family. He passed it on, along with family tradition of his story, to Thomas Brett, L.L.D. Brett communicated it in a letter to William Warren, L.L.D., president of Trinity Hall, Cambridge, who in turn passed it on to Peck.

The burial record in the Eastwell Parish Register is a 1598 transcript of the original and is dated 22 December 1550. The handwriting is consistent and not considered a forgery. The register entry reads: "Rychard Plantagenet was buryed on the 22. daye of December, anno ut supra. Ex registro de Eastwell, sub anno 1550."

In 1861, John Heneage Jesse published his Memoirs of King Richard III. He states:

Anciently, when any person of noble family was interred at Eastwell, it was the custom to affix a special mark against the name of the deceased in the register of burials. The fact is a significant one, that this aristocratic symbol is prefixed to the name of Richard Plantagenet. At Eastwell, his story still excites curiosity and interest ... A well in Eastwell Park still bears his name; tradition points to an uninscribed tomb in Eastwell churchyard as his last resting place; and, lastly, the very handwriting which, more than three centuries ago, recorded his interment, is still in existence.

A rubble-stone altar tomb with modern pointing, within the floor plan of the now ruined church of St Mary's, Eastwell, has a plaque with the following words:

Reputed to be the tomb of Richard Plantagenet, 22. December 1550

However, it had been established before the addition of the plaque that the monument is not Plantagenet's. It was in fact erected to commemorate Sir Walter Moyle of Eastwell Manor who died in 1480 and originally bore a monumental brass inset into the lost, original top slab. The church, which has been a ruin since the 1950s, is cared for by a national charity, the Friends of Friendless Churches.

== In fiction ==
- Richard Plantagenet a legendary tale, a poem by Thomas Hull, was published in 1774. It is written in the first person, spoken by Richard, who grows up in ignorance of his parentage. He meets his father just before the Battle of Bosworth. His father proposes to acknowledge him and raise him to royalty after the battle, but with the king's defeat, Richard spends the rest of his life as a lowly workman.
- Several 20th-21st century novels are based on the life of Richard of Eastwell, including:
  - The Sprig of Broom (1971), Book 2 of the "Mantlemass" series for children by Barbara Willard.
  - The King's Son by Darren Harris, with a foreword by the chair of the Richard III Society, Matthew Lewis.

== Other sources ==
- The Parallel, or a Collection of Extraordinary Cases Relating to Concealed Births, and disputed successions. 1774.
- The History of King Richard III. Edited by A. N. Kincaid. 1974. (from George Buck's original text)
- The Hopper Ring. The Ricardian Bulletin. December 1991. Robert Hamblin, with acknowledgement to Audrey Cartwright
- Notes on Royal Bastardy, Ricardian Bulletin numbers 5 and 6.
- The Royal Bastards of England. Givens-Wilson and Curteis
- The Illegitimate Children of Richard III. Peter Hammond.
- Richard III, the Road to Bosworth Field. 1985. Peter Hammond and Anne Sutton
- Eastwell Parish Registers
- Richard III Crown and People. 1985. Edited by J. Petre.
