= Thomas Moyle =

English politician (1488–1560)

Sir Thomas Moyle (1488 – 2 October 1560) was a commissioner for Henry VIII in the dissolution of the monasteries, and Speaker of the House of Commons in the Parliament of England from 1542 to 1544.

== Life ==
He was the fourth son of John Moyle (died 1495, born in Cornwall, MP for Bodmin and Kentish, Cornish and Devon landowner) and Anne Darcy (his second wife, one of Sir Robert Darcy's daughters and heirs, by his wife Elizabeth Tyrrell). By 1528, Thomas had followed his father's example and married an heiress, Katherine Jordeyne, one of the daughters of Edward Jordeyne (died 1514), a leading goldsmith at Cheapside with a manor at Raynham and employed at the mint in the Tower of London.

He entered politics in 1542 as the Member of Parliament for Peterborough and was elected Speaker of the House. He subsequently represented Rochester four times from 1545 to 1553 and King's Lynn in November 1554.

In 1537, he returned to England from Ireland, and soon made himself conspicuous as a zealous servant of Henry, rather after the manner of Audley. He enlarged his estates by securing monastic property, and soon became a rich and prominent official. In 1539, he was with Layton and Pollard in the west, and signed with them the letters from Glastonbury showing that they were trying to find hidden property in the abbey, and to collect evidence against Whiting, the abbot. The same year, he was one of those appointed to receive Anne of Cleves on her arrival. Moyle was returned member for the county of Kent in 1542, and chosen speaker of the House of Commons. He addressed the king in an extraordinarily adulatory speech, but his tenure of office was made notable by the fact that he was said to be the first speaker who claimed the privilege of freedom of speech. The exact wording of his request is, however, uncertain. During his term of office, the subject became prominent owing to Ferrar's case, in which Henry conciliated the commons. The king doubtless was glad to have a trusty servant in the chair, as during this session Catherine Howard and Lady Rochford were condemned. He was returned for Rochester in 1544, and in 1545 he was a commissioner for visiting Eastridge Hospital, Wiltshire. It is difficult to know the attitude he took up under Mary, but it seems probable that he supported her, and was, like many of Henry's followers, a Protestant only in a legal sense. On 20 September 1553, and in March 1554, he was returned for Rochester, and on 20 Dec. 1554 was elected for both Chippenham and King's Lynn.

Moyle employed Richard Plantagenet to build Eastwell Place and (according to family tradition recorded around 1720 in Desiderata Curiosa) listened to his claims to be a son of Richard III and allowed him to live in the grounds until his death in 1550. Moyle was appointed High Sheriff of Kent for 1556–57. He is thought to have died at Eastwell, Kent.

== Legacy ==
Moyle made his will on 1 August 1560, leaving his wife property at Clerkenwell and his grandchildren various houses in Newgate. Also leaving some land and an endowment to Eastwell parish for an almshouse, he split the remainder of his estates (in Kent, Surrey, Middlesex, Devon, and Somerset) between his daughter Amy's widower Thomas Kempe and his daughter Katherine, who married Sir Thomas Finch. He also left £6 13s. 4d. to Clement Norton, a former vicar of Faversham who had, like Moyle, joined in the 1543 anti-evangelical prebendaries' plot to overthrow Thomas Cranmer as Archbishop of Canterbury.

== Sources ==
- Bindoff, S.T., ed. (1982). "MOYLE, Thomas (by 1500-60), of Gray's Inn, London, Clerkenwell, Mdx. and Eastwell, Kent". The History of Parliament: the House of Commons 1509-1558. Vol. 2. pp. 642–4.
- Hyde, Patricia (2004). "Moyle, Sir Thomas (b. before 1500, d. 1560)". Oxford Dictionary of National Biography. Oxford Dictionary of National Biography (online ed.). Oxford University Press. doi:10.1093/ref:odnb/19472. (Subscription, Wikipedia Library access or UK public library membership required.)

Attribution

- This article incorporates text from a publication now in the public domain: Archbold, William Arthur Jobson (1894). "Moyle, Thomas". In Lee, Sidney (ed.). Dictionary of National Biography. Vol. 39. London: Smith, Elder & Co.

Political offices
Preceded by Sir Nicholas Hare	Speaker of the House of Commons; 1542-1544	Succeeded by Sir John Baker
