= Eastwell Park =

Parkland and country estate in Eastwell, Kent, England

Coordinates: 51°11′30″N 0°53′03″E

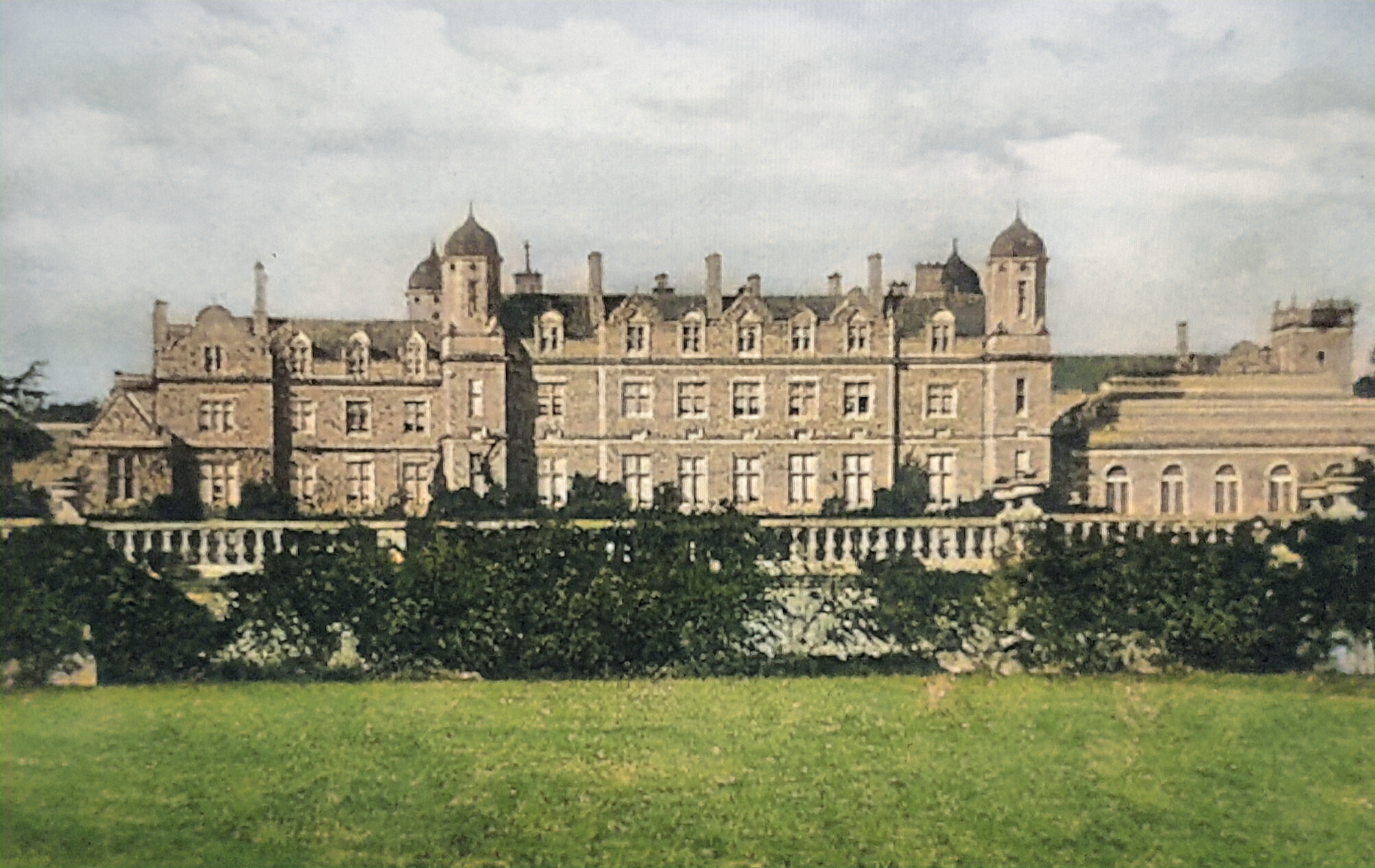
Eastwell Park, South Facade. Demolished (rc)

Eastwell Park is a large area of parkland and a country estate in the civil parish of Eastwell, adjoining Ashford, Kent, in England. It was owned by the Earls of Winchilsea for more than three centuries. Over time, successive buildings have served as homes to Sir Thomas Moyle, the Earls of Winchilsea and Nottingham, and others. It was used as a royal residence from 1874 to 1893 for Prince Alfred, Duke of Edinburgh.

The estate is now mainly a farming concern, raising crops and sheep. It has a large shallow lake that can be fished and Eastwell Towers. The largest building is Eastwell Manor, a stately home that was rebuilt on a smaller scale during the 1920s using the material from the previous larger house, it is now operated as a country house hotel. The manor and towers are Grade II listed.

== Eastwell Manor ==
The earliest manor was owned by Hugh de Montford and recorded in 1080s in the Domesday Book. It then passed through several owners including Barons Poynings and Earls of Northumberland. In 1537, the 6th Earl of Northumberland died without issue and Eastwell was sold to Sir Thomas Moyle.

The next country house at Eastwell was built for Sir Thomas Moyle between 1540 and 1550. One of the men employed on the estate was the bricklayer Richard Plantagenet, who was suspected to be an illegitimate son of Richard III. The daughter and co-heiress of Sir Thomas Moyle, Catherine Moyle eventually married Sir Thomas Finch and inherited Eastwell, their eldest son was the ancestor of Earls of Winchilsea, Earls of Nottingham and Earls of Aylesford.

=== The Finch ===
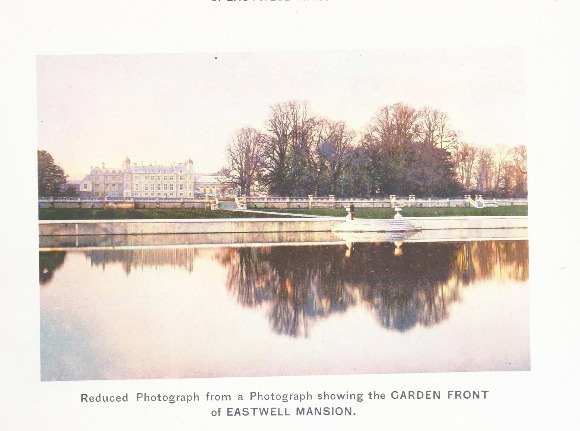
Eastwell Park from the south pond (rc)

William Winde made alterations to the manor in 1685 for the 3rd Earl of Winchilsea, Winde also recalled while altering there, he helped to plant a big tree at Eastwell. Sir James Thornhill painted the staircase ceiling and the end of the Great Hall at Eastwell Park in 1699–1716 for the 4th and 5th Earl of Winchilsea, the hall was painted to depict the Judgement of Paris and the toilet of Venus.

The park at Eastwell used to comprise about 2000 acres of some of the finest land in Kent, having a very varied surface of hill and dale, its elevated part give it a commanding prospect, both north and south extend for many miles, from Sheerness on one side to the lake and France on the other, it was laid out by the earlier Earls of Winchilsea and contained some forest notable for its deer.

The 6th Earl of Winchilsea died unmarried in 1729 and his title and estates were inherited by his second cousin, Daniel Finch, 2nd Earl of Nottingham, now also the 7th Earl of Winchilsea (d. 1730).

In 1769, the 8th Earl of Winchilsea and 3rd Earl of Nottingham left the family Kentish properties, including the ancestral Winchilsea seat Eastwell Park to his other nephew George Finch-Hatton, son of his youngest brother Hon. Edward Finch.

In 1790, the noted diarist Hon. John Byng remarked "This is a noble Park, with Lofty Hills in The Centre commanding fine Views, both inland and of The Sea. Into the magnificent Old Mansion I was forbidden Entrance; as Mr Finch Hatton with ‘much company were at home'".

Between 1793 and 1799 the Moyle manor house was replaced by one built in the neo-classical style for George Finch-Hatton and his wife Lady Elizabeth Murray, daughter of 2nd Earl of Mansfield to designs by Robert Adam's former draughtsman, Joseph Bonomi (1739–1808). The new Bonomi designed house was built on large scale, with an imposing frontage, suites of state apartments with accommodations for a large number of guests, the interior resembles Bonomi and Robert Adam's decorative style. This house was visited in 1805 by Jane Austen.

Their son the 10th Earl of Winchilsea and 5th Earl of Nottingham, known for his duel with Duke of Wellington, decided to expand and add a Victorian Tudor-style wing to the left of the main house designed by William Burn in 1843, it was his intention to unify the entire house facade into Tudor style later; the house had seven bays and wings of three bays each. His third son, Henry, was born at Eastwell; he was the father of Denys Finch Hatton.

In 1828, the Duchess of Kent and young future Queen Victoria paid a visit to the 10th Earl of Winchilsea. They stayed two days at Eastwell Park, before their return to Kensington Palace.

In 1838, the 10th Earl hosted Duke of Wellington and Lord Maryborough, amongst others to a week of hunting at the estate.

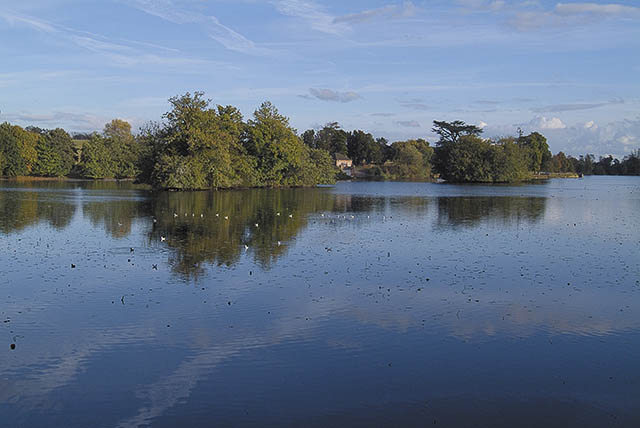
Eastwell Lake

In the 1840s, the 10th Earl of Winchilsea built Eastwell Lake, the newly formed large lake was created by damming a stream of the River Great Stour. to commemorate the new lake, a model gun brig ship was launched at Eastwell Lake in 1848, it was attended by many locals and featured in newspapers.

By the mid-1860s, the 11th Earl of Winchilsea, a gambler, experienced serious financial difficulties which eventually forced him to leave the property. On 4 December 1868, trustees appointed under the Winchilsea Estate Act (1865) entered into a contract to let Eastwell Park, together with its furnishings and effects, to the Duke of Abercorn for a period of five years. Lord Winchilsea had been obliged to vacate the property sometime prior to December 1868, and he was formally adjudged bankrupt on 5 October 1870.

=== Royal residence ===
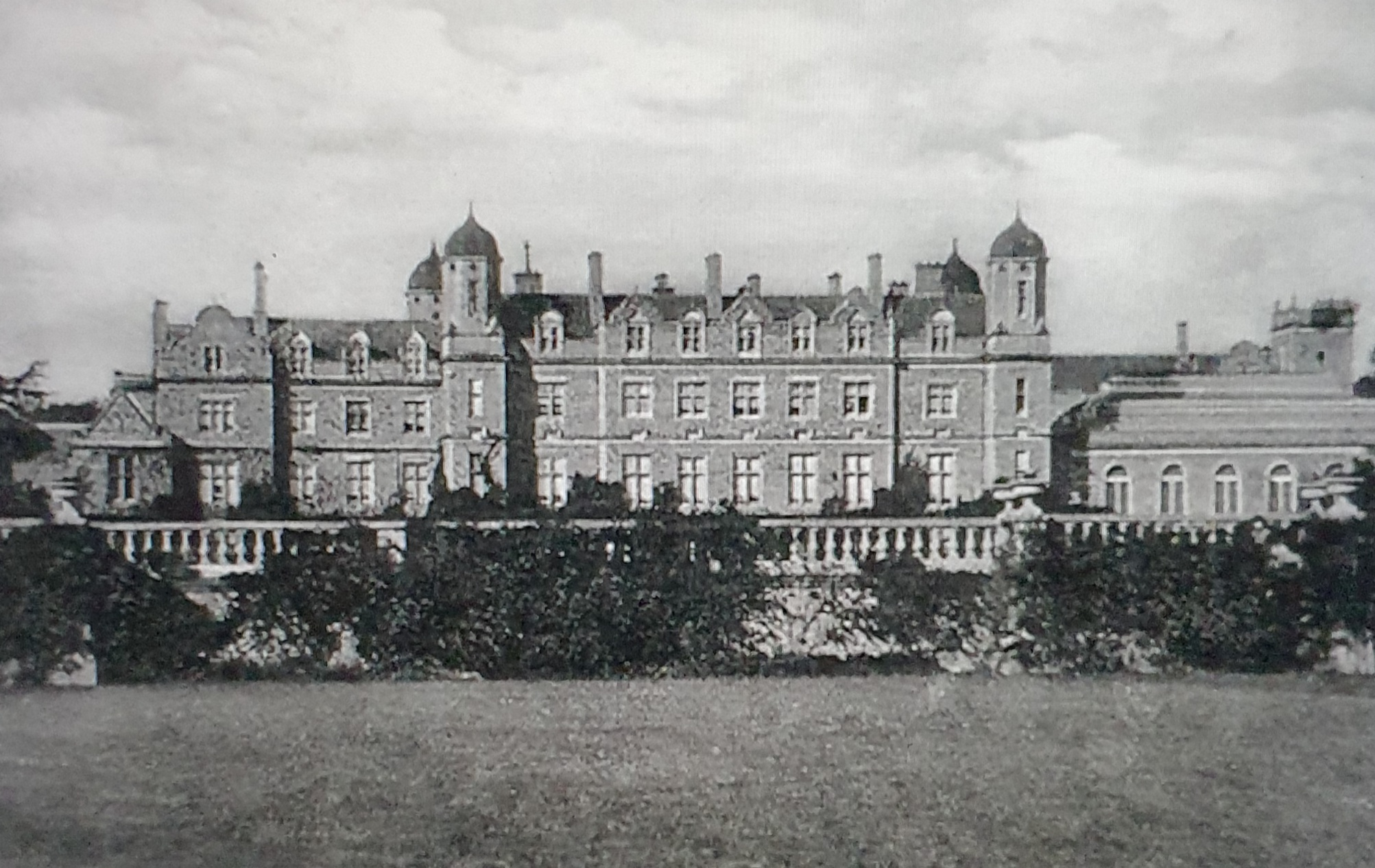
Eastwell Park after Lord Gerard remodeling in 1894. This house was demolished in 1926 and rebuilt as current Eastwell Manor. (Lost Heritage)

Eastwell Park was next occupied in 1874 by Prince Alfred, Duke of Edinburgh, the second son of Queen Victoria, with his wife Grand Duchess Maria Alexandrovna of Russia, the only daughter of Emperor Alexander II of Russia. They lived here for 20 years with his family until 1893, when he inherited the duchy of Saxe-Coburg and Gotha in Germany. During that time, Queen Victoria was a frequent visitor and there are photographs of her skating on the lake. Prince Alfred's older brother, the future King Edward VII, and Queen Alexandra were frequent visitors. Prince Alfred's wife, the Duchess of Edinburgh, never liked England, but from her letter written in 1879, the Russian-born duchess was swayed and described the countryside around Eastwell Park as being "very pretty, everything is so green, so fresh." The duchess later confessed, "reconciles me a little to the English countryside."

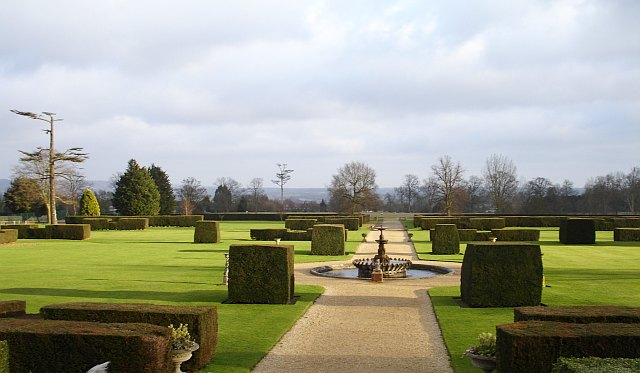
View of the scenic hills from Eastwell Park. (South view)

The 5th Earl of Warwick recalled visits to Eastwell Park saying "Among the great sporting estates Eastwell was one of the best", it's also where "I saw the finest jewels I have ever seen in my life". The Earl and Countess of Warwick were talking jewelry when the duchess said to the countess: "If you would like to see my jewels, I will tell my maid to put them all out in my room tomorrow evening, after tea, and if your husband is interested, bring him too." At the appointed date, the earl and countess went back to Eastwell and were astonished to find that the duchess's room was filled with

"precious stones; the bed, the tables, the chairs were covered with cases containing tiaras, ropes of pearls, necklaces, bracelets, brooches of rarest lustre and beauty and inestimable value. One would have thought that the world had been ransacked to lay these treasures at the Duchess’s feet, and there seemed to be enough for an entire royal family rather than for one member of it.".

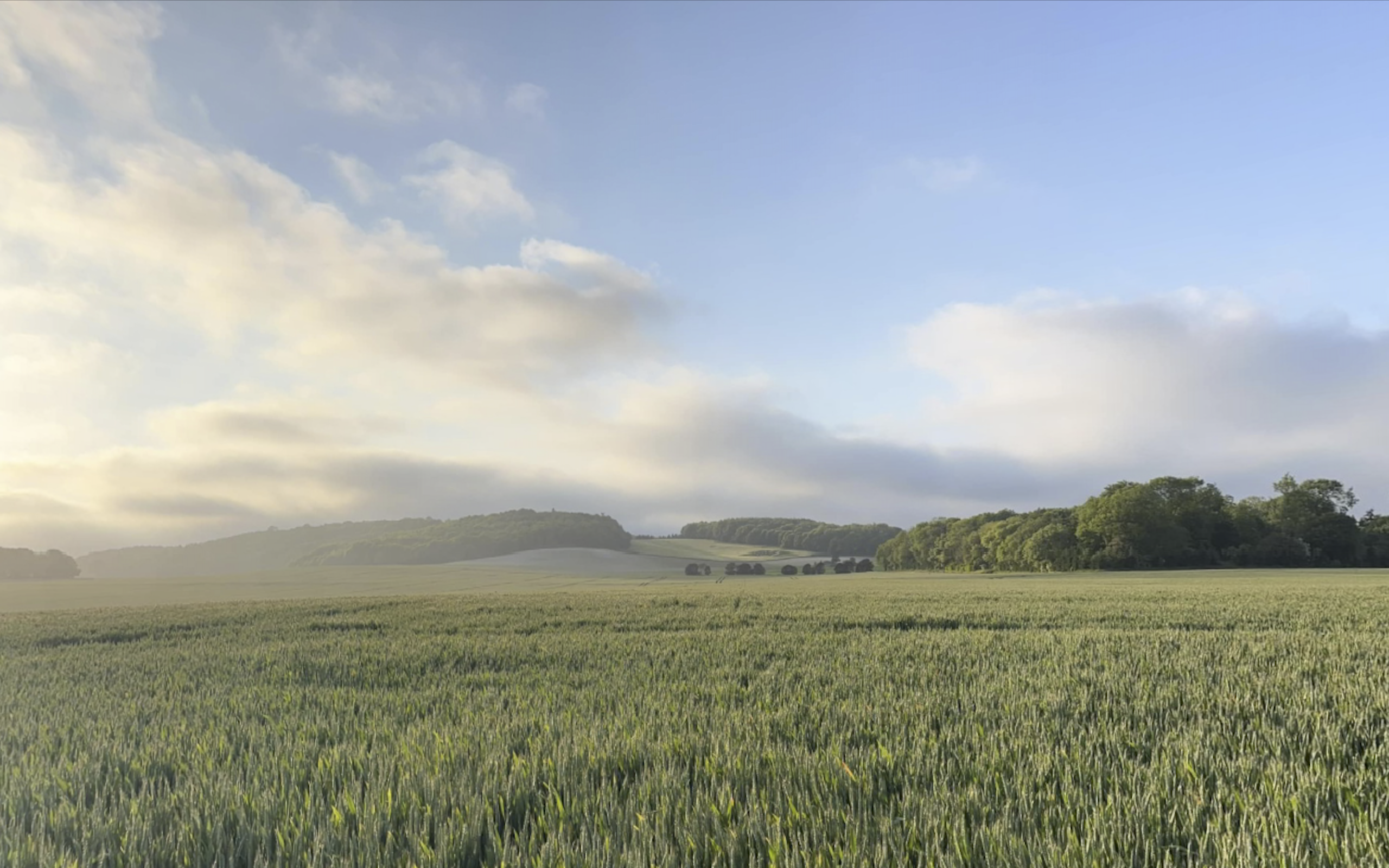
Eastwell Park Landscape. (North view)

In 1875, Prince Alfred's eldest daughter, Queen Marie of Romania, was born at Eastwell Park. In her memoirs, she recalled fondly:

"Beautiful Eastwell with its big great gray house, its magnificent park, with its herds of deer and picturesque Highland cattle, its lake, its woods, its garden with the old cedar tree which was our fairy mansion Eastwell, the house where I was born, with its many rooms, explored and unexplored, our nurseries, our schoolroom, and Mamma’s cosy boudoir where she read to us of an evening and allowed us to finger the treasures on her tables; the breakfast-room, the drawing-room, and the dear big library where the Christmas tree always stood and out of which a passage-like conservatory led into the garden. This passage ran down a flight of steps to a larger conservatory below, which was filled with tree-ferns; anyhow, it was the tree ferns that impressed."

Later, she also recalled her mother playing duets with her friend Lady Randolph Churchill in the big Eastwell library while the kids would play in the other corner. The Eastwell breakfast room, meanwhile, always reminded her of her uncle Duke of Albany and King Carlos I, the former would pretend to break his front tooth, making the whole table panicked. At the same time, the latter was handsome and would make subpar jokes which the kids would laugh at anyway.

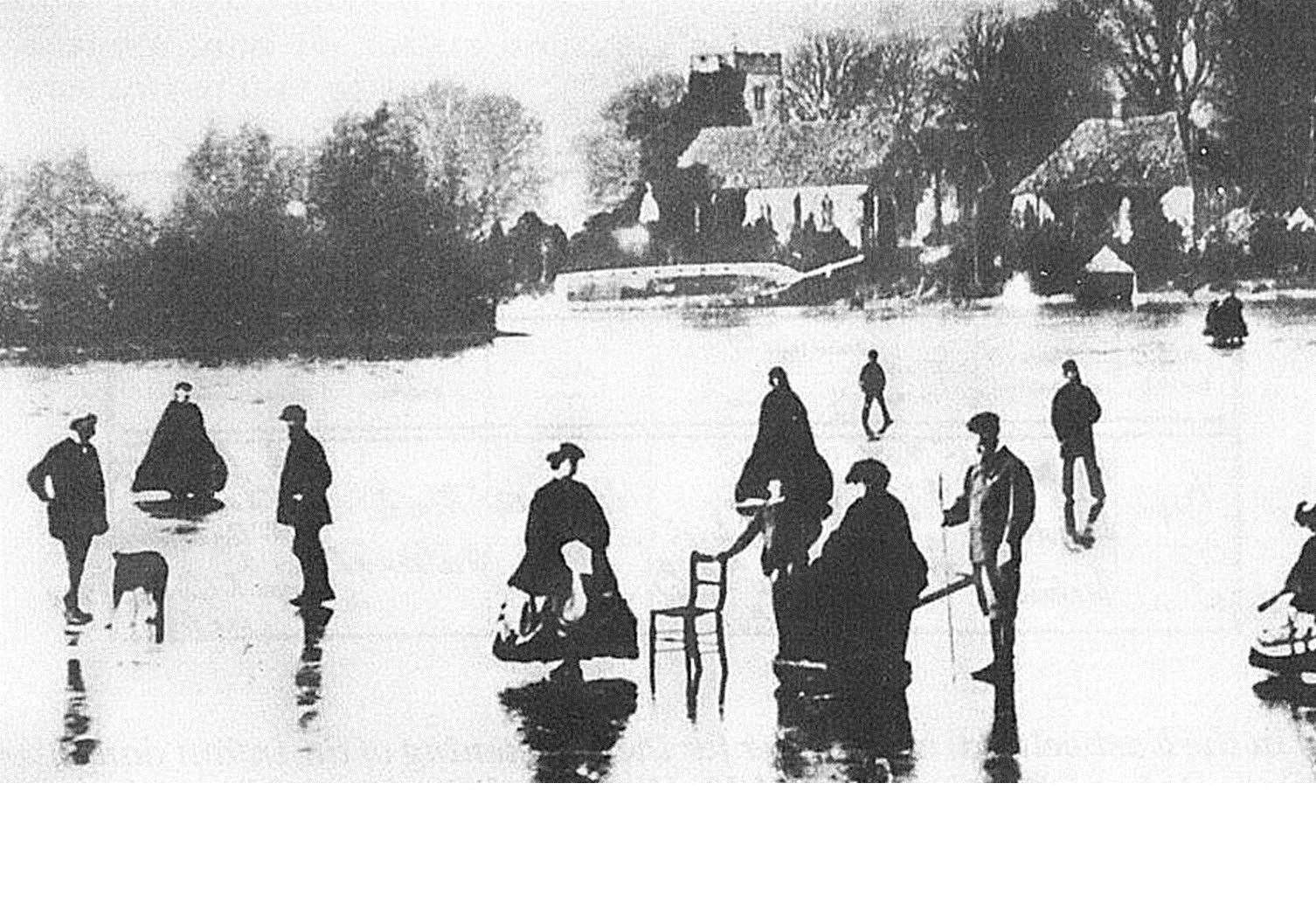
Queen Victoria skating at Eastwell Lake, with Princess Beatrice and John Brown, St Mary church in the background.

In 1884, another of Alfred's children, Princess Beatrice – who later married into the Spanish royal family – was also born at Eastwell Park.

The royal family eventually moved out of Eastwell Park in 1893, the royal governess made the royal children pack and donate their toys to Eastwell's servants and their children.

=== Early 1900s ===
The 12th Earl of Winchilsea and Nottingham sold the estate in 1894 for a quarter of million pounds £250,000 (equivalent to £40 million in 2025) to 2nd Baron Gerard of Garswood Hall.

Eastwell at the time comprised 6000 acres, with the park being one of the largest in the kingdom. Baron Gerard then largely renovated Eastwell Park, he continued the previous 1843 plan to remodel the facade into Tudor style by adding 2 more towers and unified the main block facade, he also added a huge winter garden and conservatory and it was completed in 1898, but he died in 1902 and Eastwell was inherited by his son 3rd Baron Gerard; his friend King Edward VII was a frequent visitor.

During the First World War, Eastwell Park was made into a convalescent home by Lady Northcote (who tenanted Eastwell from Lord Gerard), she offered the house to the Canadian Red Cross Society and received convalescent patients from Monks Horton in the summer months of 1915 - 1919.

=== Demolition and rebuilding of Eastwell Manor ===
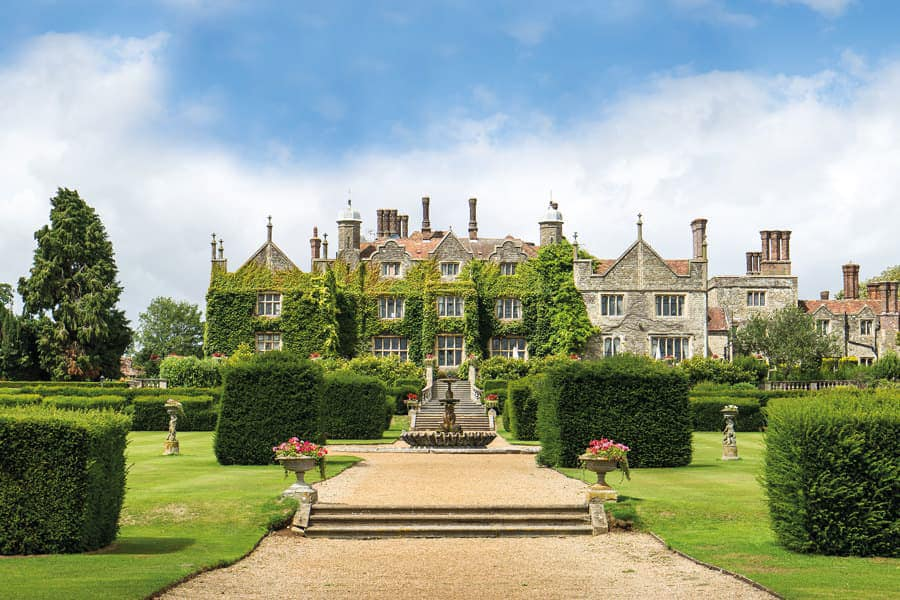
Eastwell Manor (rebuilt in 1920s)

In 1920, Lord Gerard put Eastwell for sale, it was bought by Osborn Dan in 1922, who never lived in the house and instead chose to remain nearby at his previous house, he then sold Eastwell to Sir John Pennefather in 1924, who thought the newly remodelled 18th century house was way too large and demolished it. A much smaller house in a Neo-Elizabethan manor style was built on the same site from 1926–1928 using the material from the previous house, it was said that his architectural intention was to create a house reflecting Eastwell medieval history, the style was almost identical to his previous house Markyate Cell Park, he was very excited about the rebuilding that he sleeps in tents with his architect on the garden, but Pennefather's health declined and he was overcome by blindness, he never lived in the house, instead putting it up for sale in 1928.

In 1930, the house was bought by Guinevere, Countess of Midleton, they lived here until 1963, her son Captain George Sinclair Gould "Brodrick" (1915–2003) took care of Eastwell and remembered his childhood here, Lady Midleton died in 1978. Eventually Eastwell manor was acquired by Champneys

After many changes, Eastwell Manor now operates as a country house hotel. There is an indoor swimming pool and a Champneys spa, and a nine-hole golf course has been laid out in the grounds. The rest of the estate is used for farming.

== St Mary the Virgin Church ==
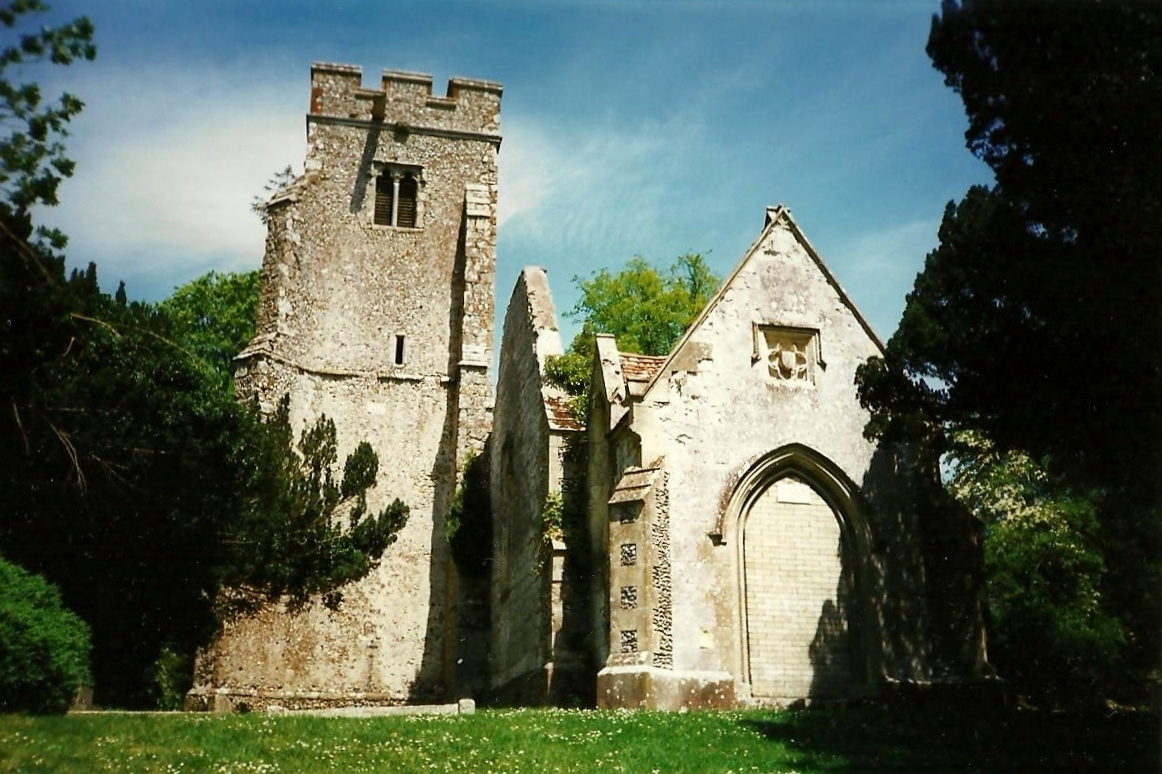
St Mary Church, Eastwell Park

Next to the large shallow lake at Eastwell Park is the ruined church of St Mary the Virgin, which is now cared for by the Friends of Friendless Churches. The church dates to the 14th century but became unused after the First World War. A storm in 1951 caused severe damage: parts of the nave and the choir fell. The tower remains reasonably intact. Marble monuments once found in the church are now in the Victoria and Albert Museum. A memorial located in the former choir commemorates the grave of Richard Plantagenet, alleged to be the illegitimate son of Richard III.

George Finch-Hatton, 11th Earl of Winchilsea (1815–1887), his second wife Lady Elizabeth Georgiana (d. 1904, daughter of Francis Conyngham, 2nd Marquess Conyngham) as well as his only son George William Finch-Hatton, Viscount Maidstone (1852–1879) are buried in a simple grave in the overgrown part of the church cemetery.

== Eastwell Towers ==
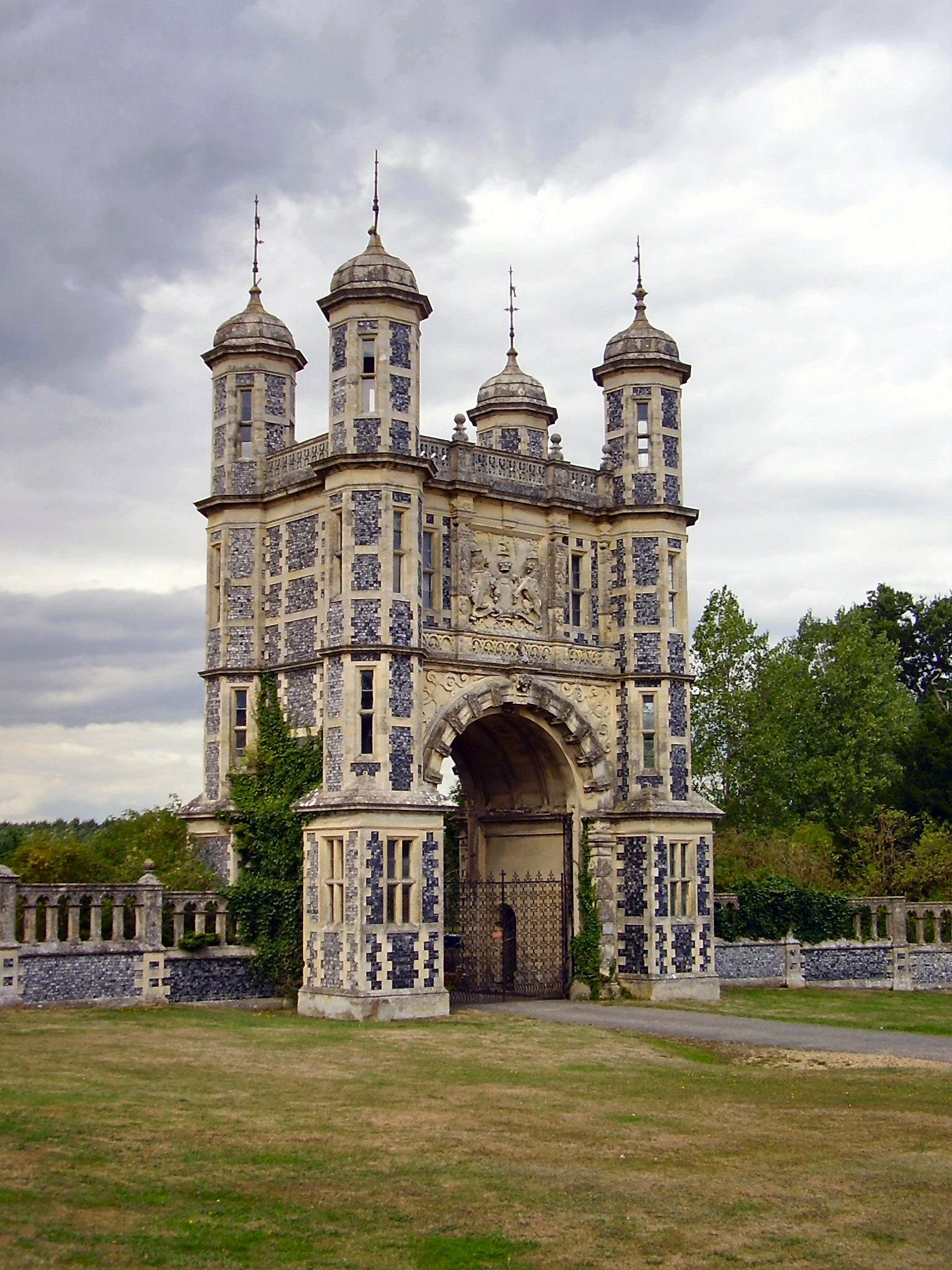
Eastwell Towers

The distinctive Neo-Jacobean structure now known as Eastwell Towers stands a mile south-south west of the manor. It was the original main gatehouse to Eastwell Park built in 1848 for the 10th Earl of Winchilsea by architect, William Burn.

It originally featured the coat of arms of the Earls of Winchilsea and the Earl's coronet; it has been changed to the coat of arms of the Barons Gerard and the Baron's coronet.

== Home Farm ==
Home Farm at Eastwell Park was built far from the main stately home. The large residence is surrounded by fields and lies close to the church of St Mary the Virgin.

== Gallery ==
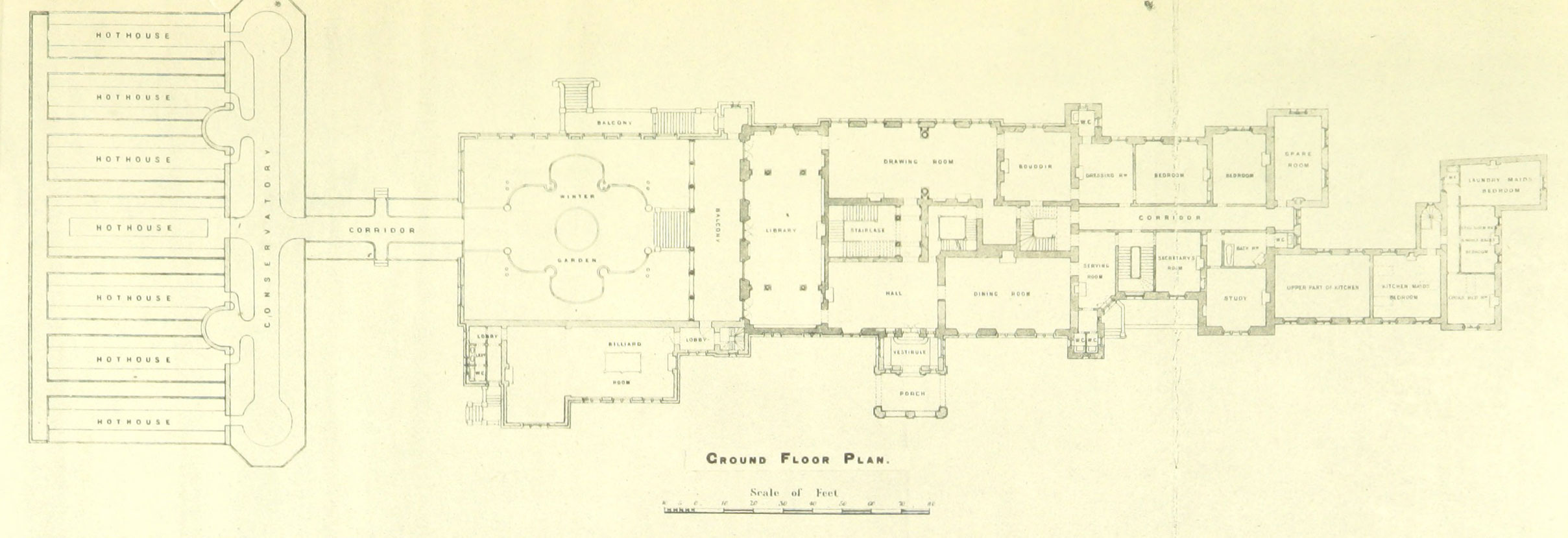

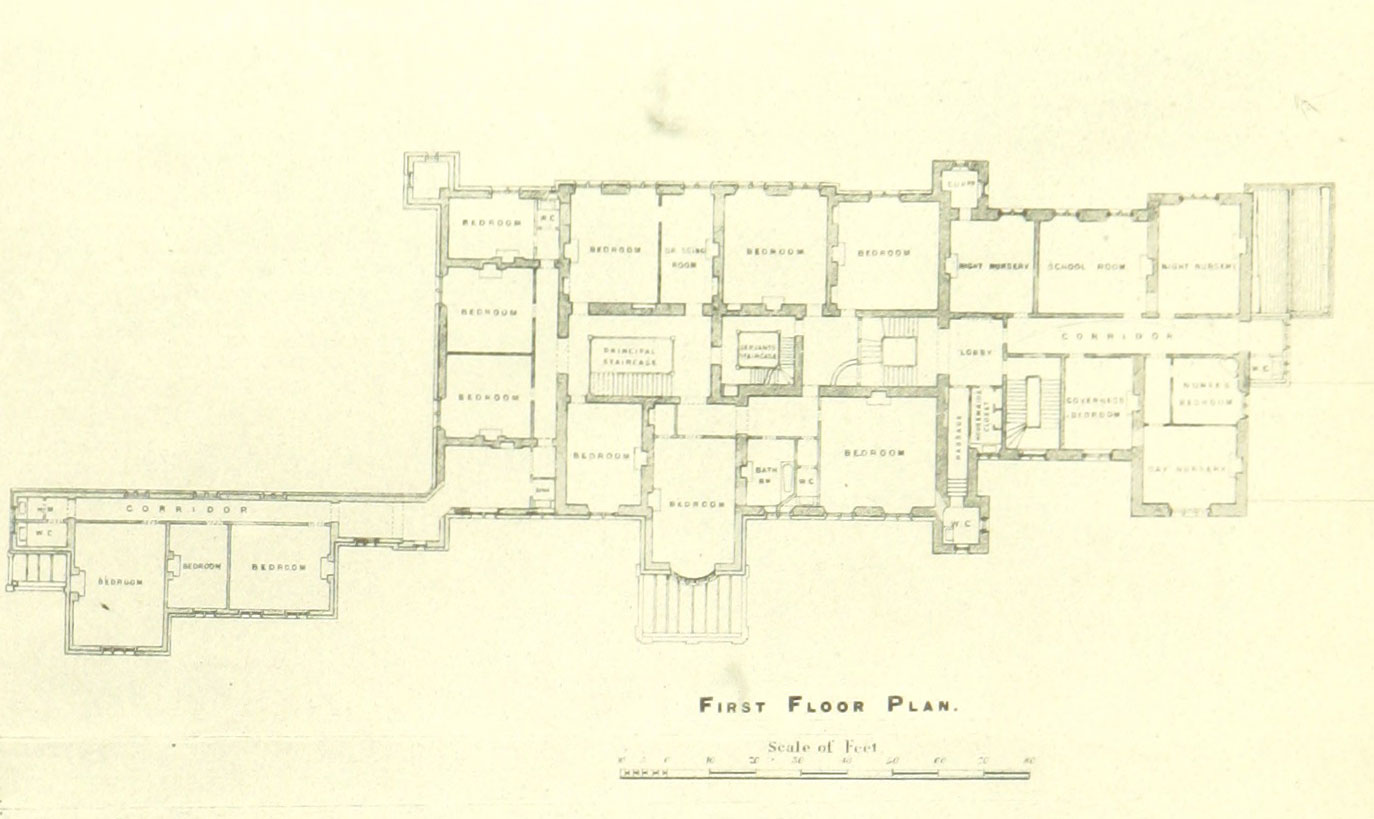

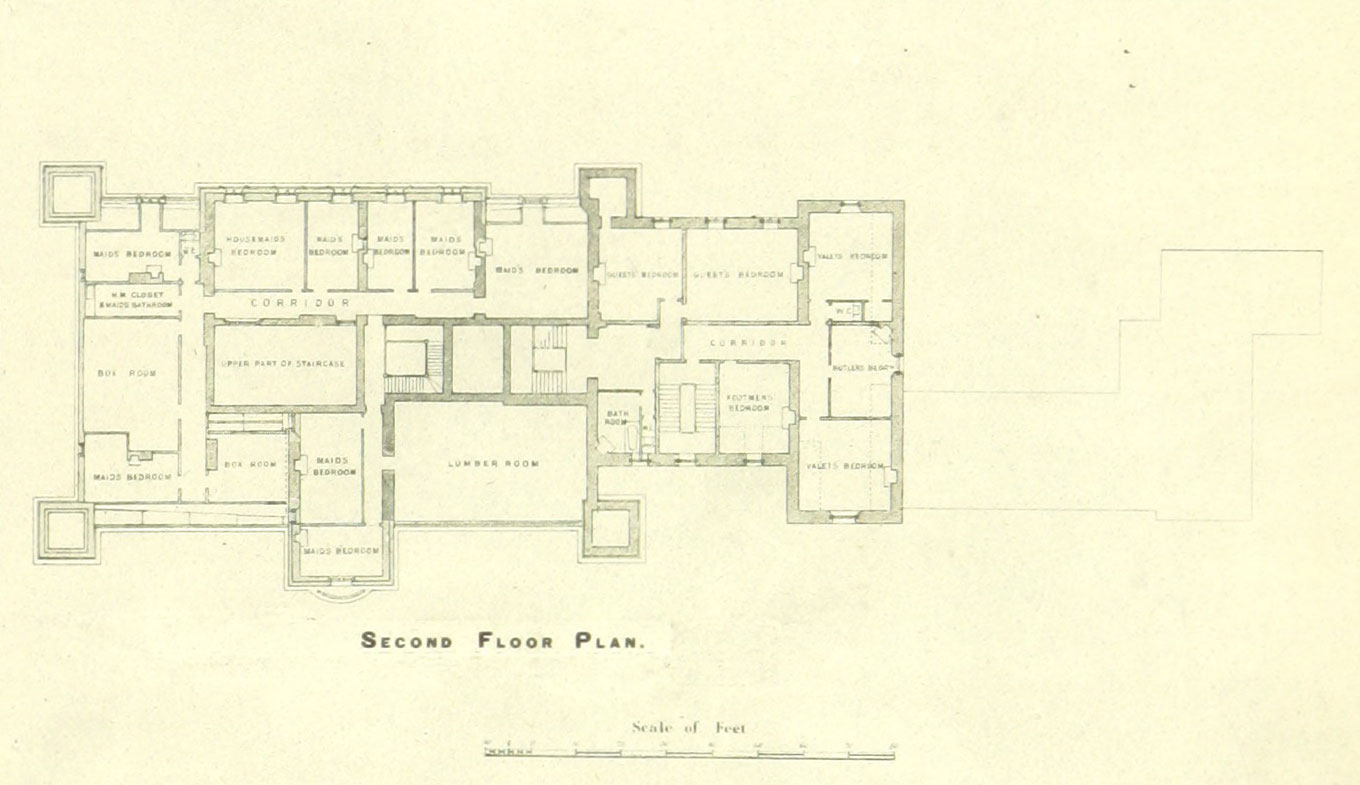

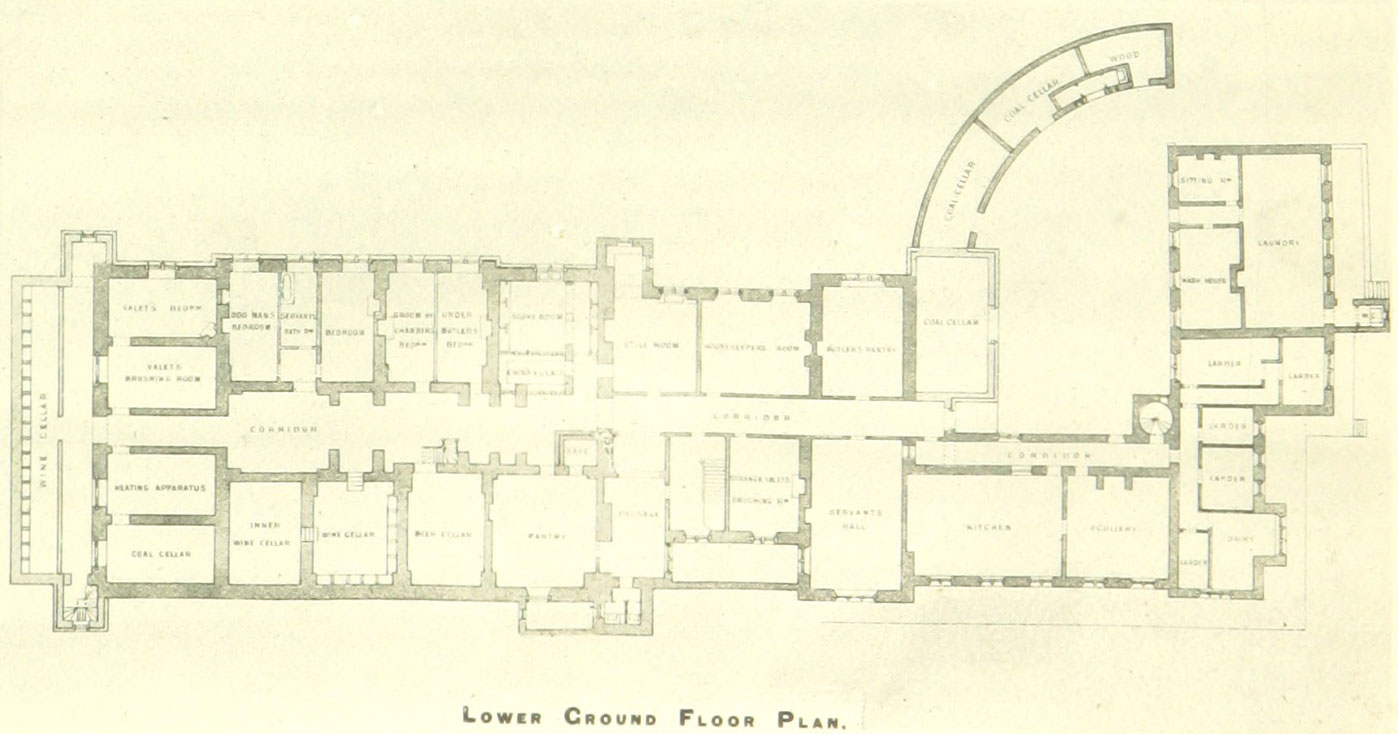

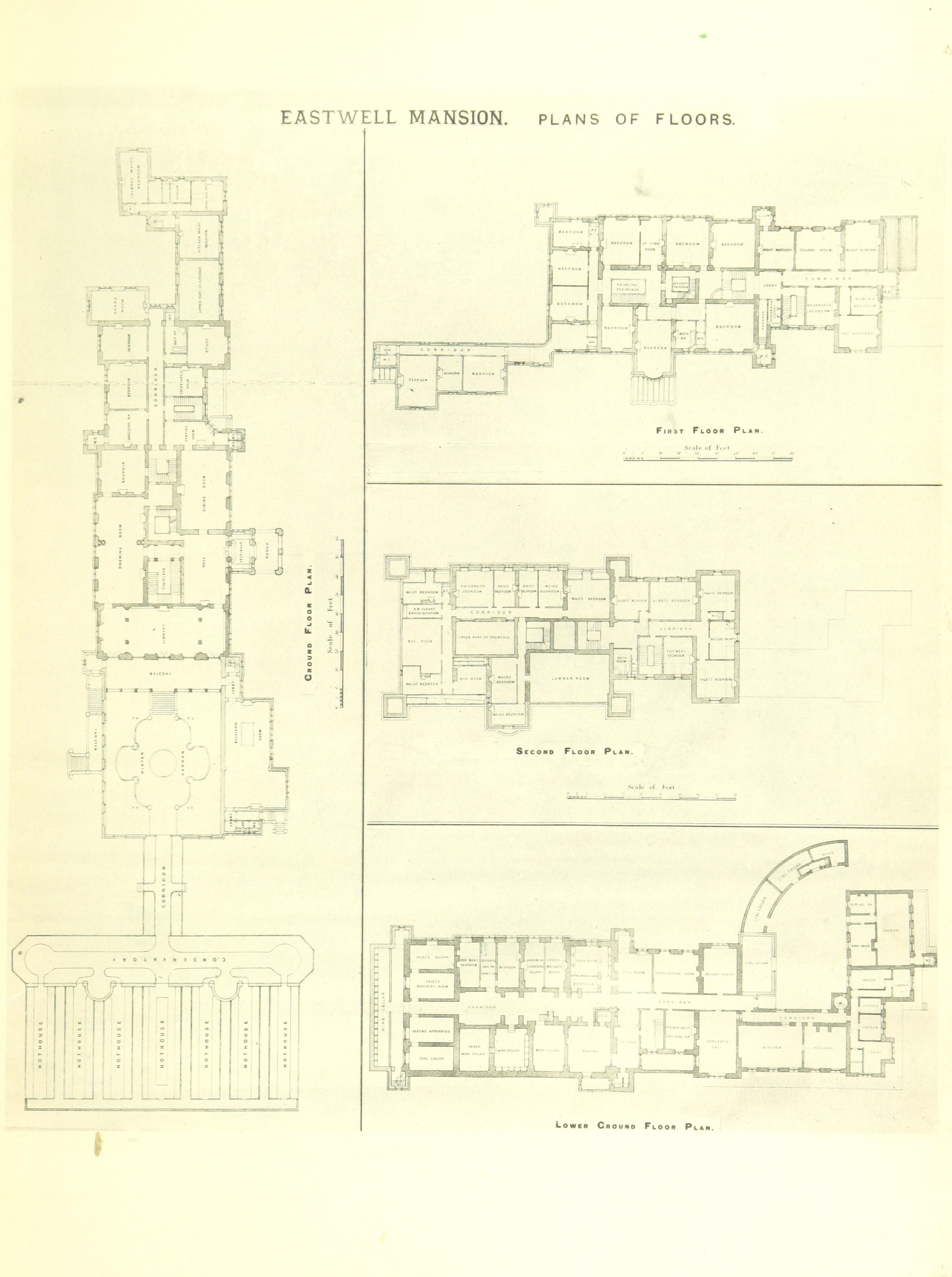

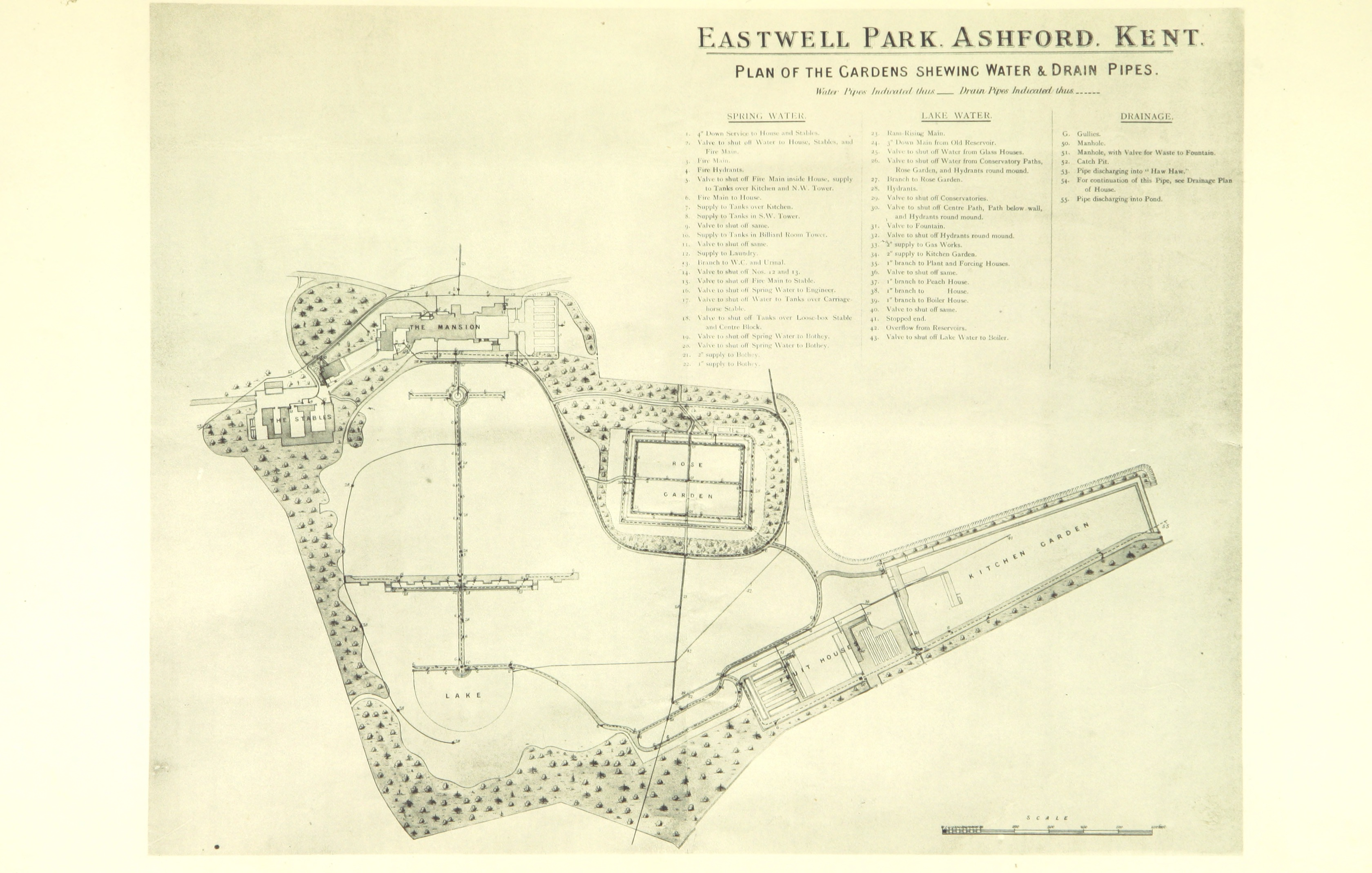

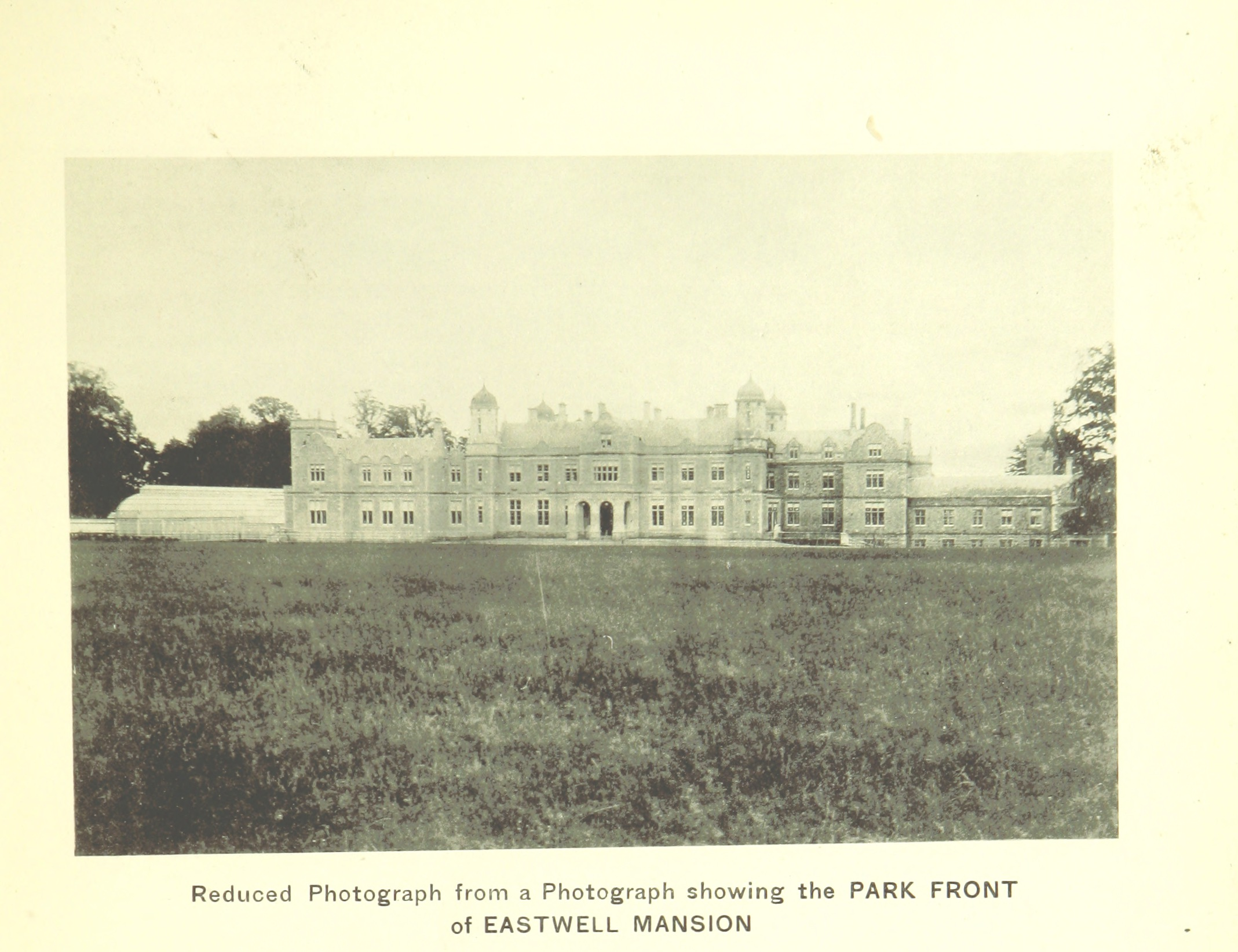

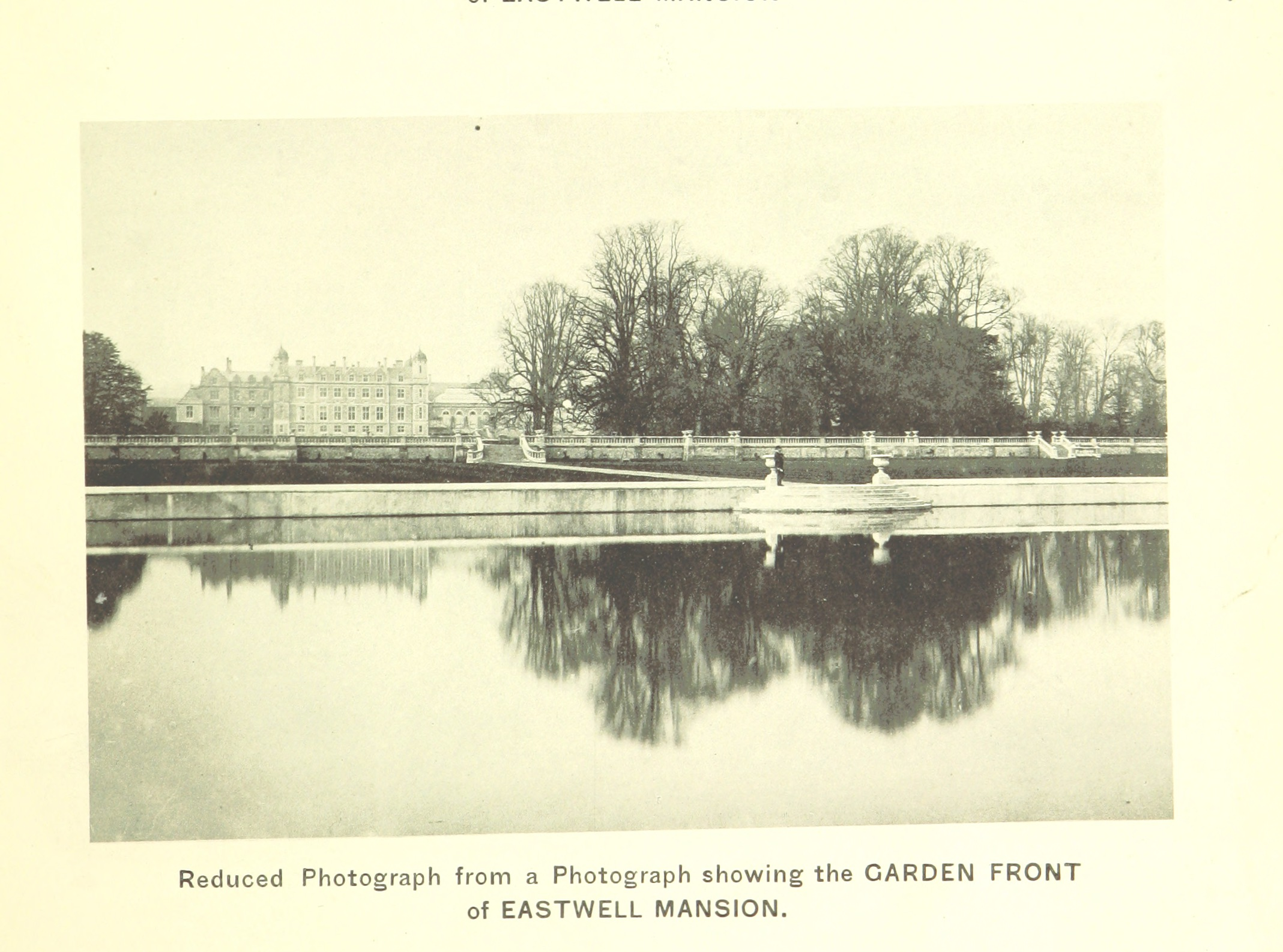

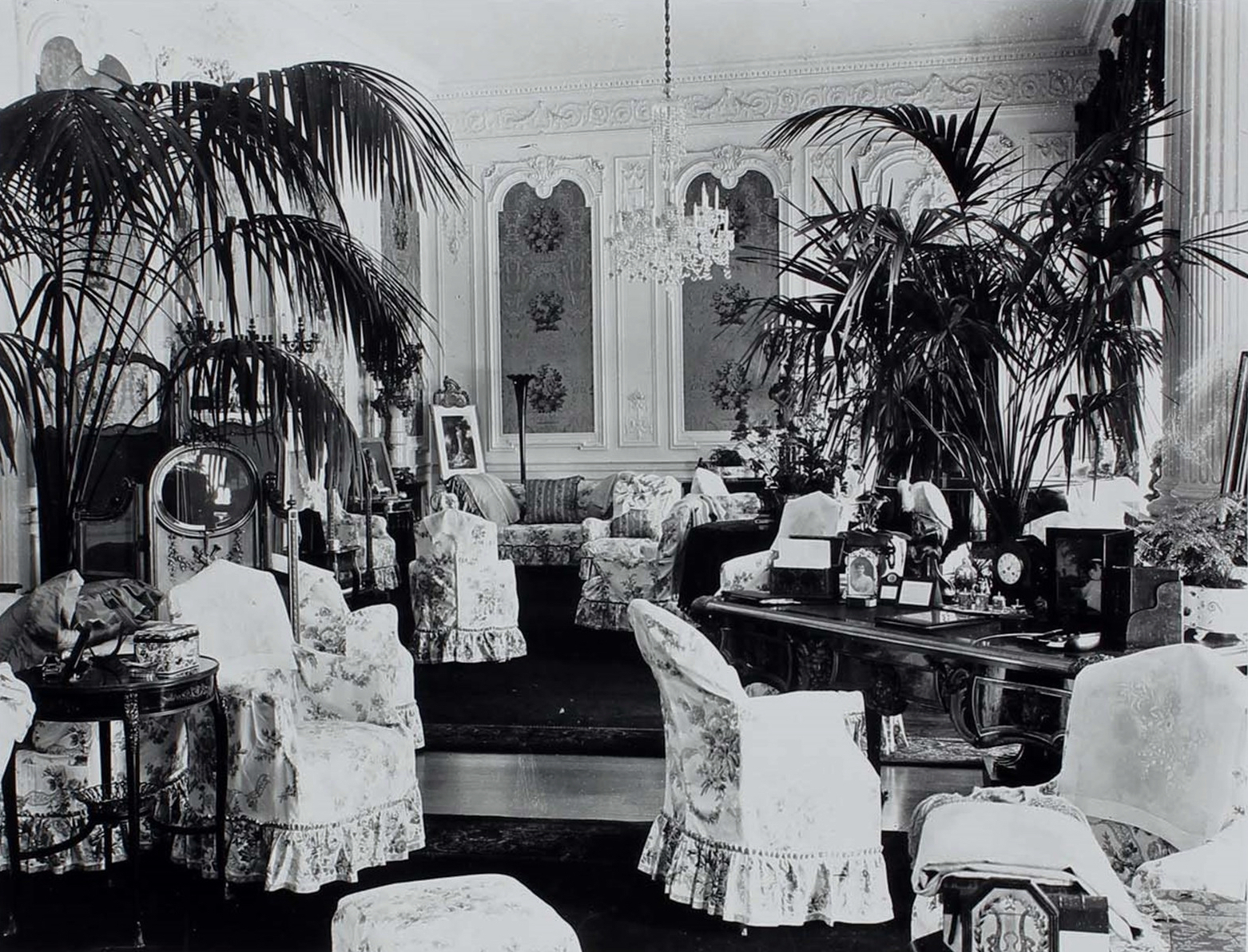

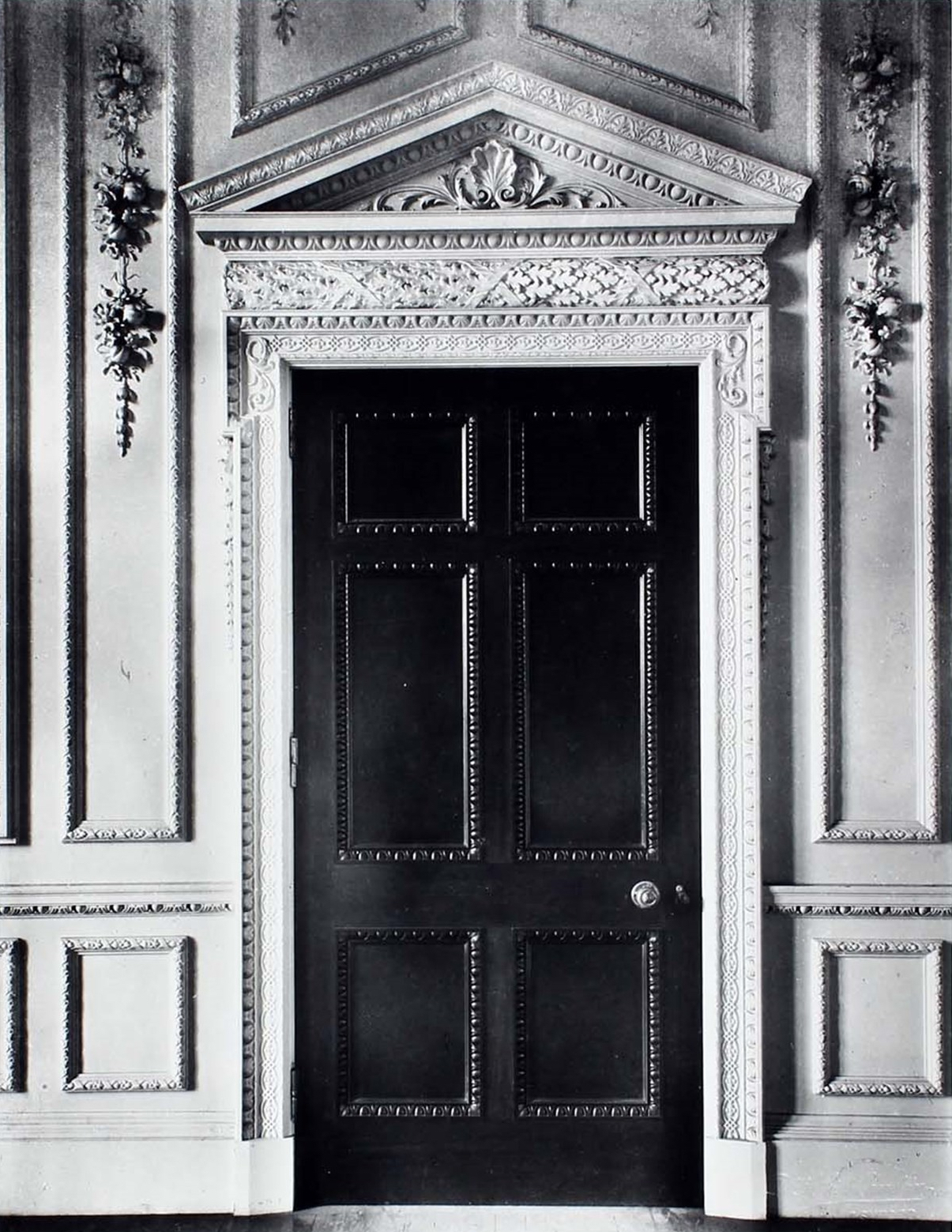
