= 1914 Kenwood House ball =

Ball held in London, 1914

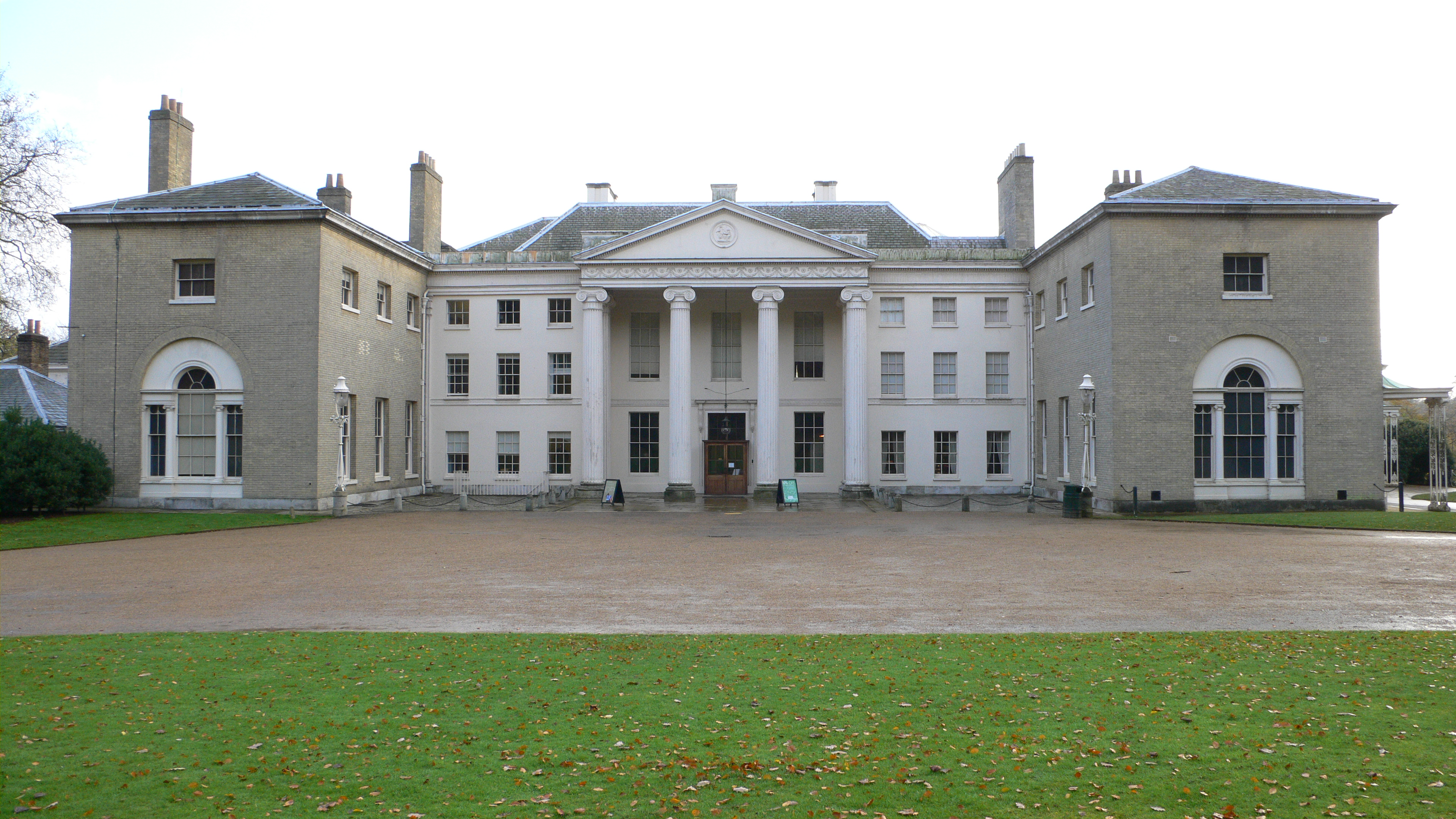
The north entrance of Kenwood House, 2005

A ball was held at Kenwood House, London, by Grand Duke Michael Mikhailovich of Russia on 11 June 1914. The ball was held in honour of Michael's daughters Anastasia and Nadejda and marked the coming-out of the latter, who was aged 18. It was attended by a large number of British and foreign nobility, including King George V and Queen Mary, and was one of the last big social events before the start of the First World War. The night featured a dinner and dance demonstration by Maurice Mouvet and Florence Walton. The latter was the first royal command performance by North American dancers; Mary specifically requested a demonstration of the controversial tango as she had not seen one before. A ball after the dinner was attended by 2,000 members of society and was accompanied by a Viennese orchestra.

== Background ==
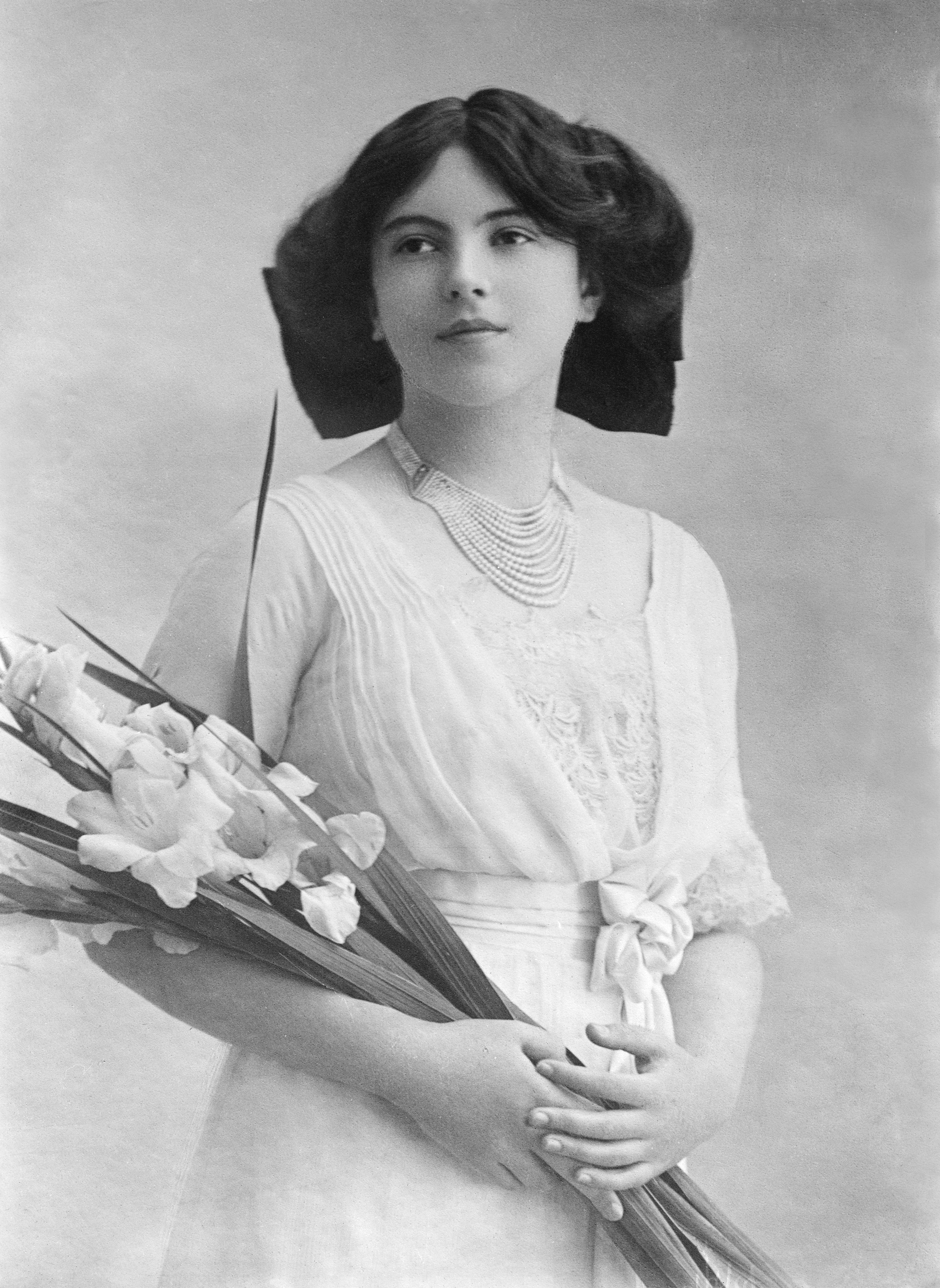
Nada pictured c. 1914

Kenwood House was occupied by Grand Duke Michael Mikhailovich of Russia. He was a great-great-grandson of Russian ruler Catherine the Great and a second cousin of the then tsar Nicholas II. Michael had lived in exile in Western Europe, and particularly the United Kingdom, since marrying Countess Sophie of Merenberg in 1891. The morganatic marriage had been conducted in Italy without the permission of his parents and was illegal under Russian law. Michael rented Kenwood House from 1910, for £2,200 a year. He was active in the London social circuit and held many parties and balls there.

The 11 June 1914 ball was intended to mark the coming-out of Michael's 18-year-old daughter Countess Nadejda de Torby (known as Nada) and was given in her name and that of her 22-year-old sister Countess Anastasia de Torby (known as Zia). The ball was one of the last big social events before the outbreak of the First World War and was attended by nobility from European states that would be enemies within the following weeks. (Note: The assassination of Archduke Franz Ferdinand, the catalyzing event for the war, occurred on 28 June; the war officially began on 28 July.)

== Dinner ==
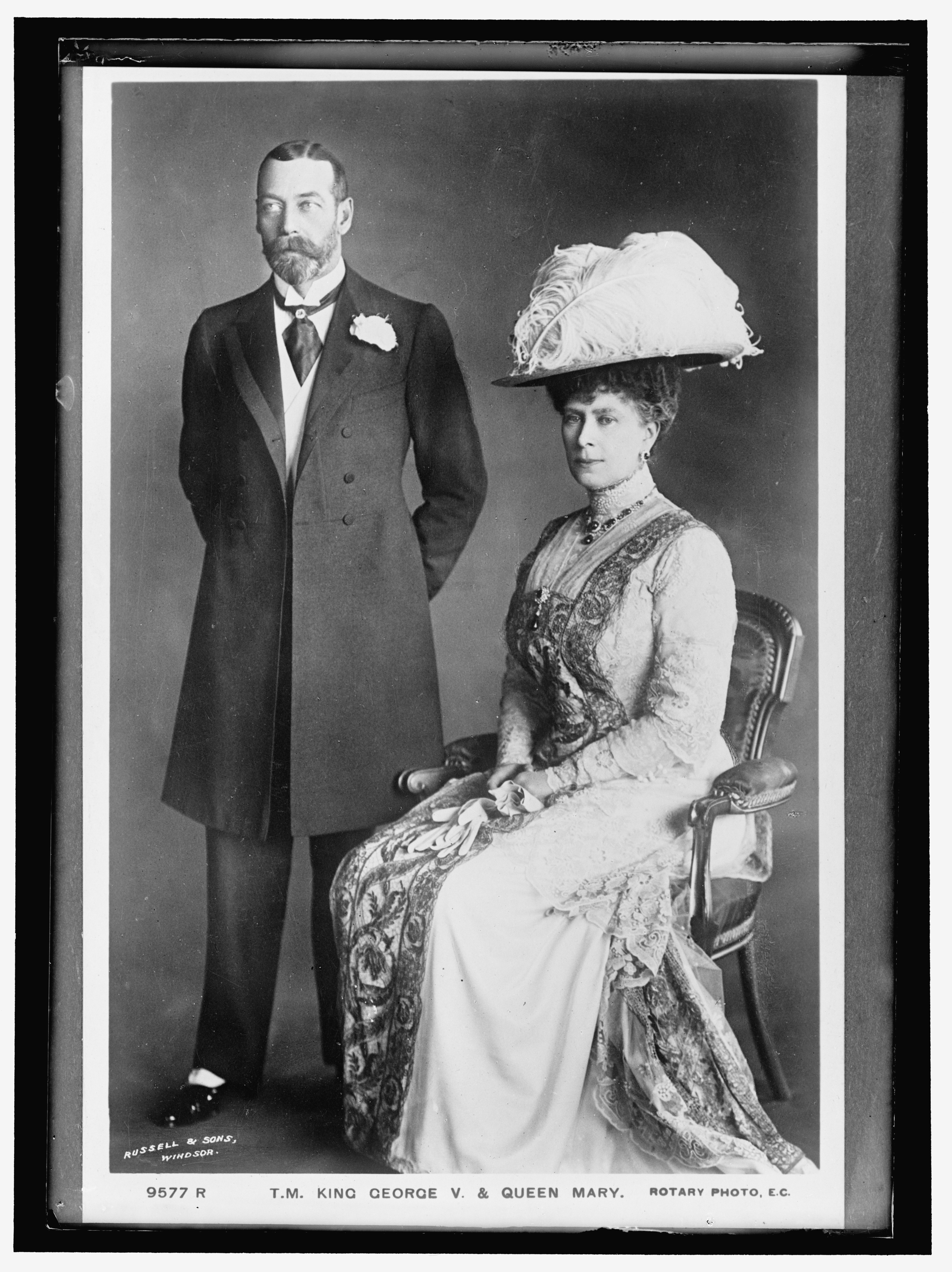
King George V and Queen Mary, in 1914

In preparation for the event, the grounds and driveways of Kenwood Hall were illuminated and the rooms decorated with flowers and ferns. The event began with a dinner attended by numerous distinguished guests. The principal guests were King George V and Queen Mary. They were met at the house's north entrance by Michael whilst the other guests were greeted by Countess Torby in the Adam's Room. The presence of the king and queen required a larger than usual number of Metropolitan Policeofficers (as well as the entire Palace Police contingent) due to a heightened threat of suffragette action.

Other royal guests at the dinner included Princess Henry of Battenberg, Princess Christian of Schleswig-Holstein, Princess Helena Victoria of Schleswig-Holstein and Admiral Prince Louis of Battenberg. Other attendees included the Duchess of Marlborough, the Duke and Duchess of Sutherland, the Earl and Countess of Leicester, the Earl and Countess of Mar and Kellie, the Earl and Countess of Derby and their daughter Lady Victoria Stanley, the Earl and Countess of Essex, the Earl and Countess of Granard, the Earl Howe, Viscount and Viscountess Curzon, Lord and Lady Nunburnholme, Lord Herbert Vane-Tempest, Lady de Trafford, Lady Desborough, Lord Annaly, former prime minister Arthur Balfour, Charles Cust and the Honorable Basil Fitzherbert. Foreign attendees included Grand Duchess Anastasia of Mecklenburg-Schwerin and the Marquis of Soveral. All of the guests were seated at a single long table during the dinner.

== Dance exhibition ==
Walton and Mouvet, pictured in 1913

After dinner there was a demonstration of dancing by married couple Maurice Mouvet and Florence Walton. The pair became the first American dancers to appear in a performance by royal command. The tango, a relatively new dance, had been performed in Paris since around 1910 and had been danced in London since 1912, though it was opposed by the press due to its supposed immorality. The dance gained popularity over the following two social seasons and it was originally scheduled to be performed at the Kenwood House ball. It was rumoured at the time that Mary had banned the dance at the Royal Court and it was removed from the programme.

Mouvet and Walton completed a number of other dances and Mary indicated disappointment that a tango was not demonstrated as she had never seen one before. The couple then performed an impromptu seven-minute dance for the queen. In deference to the audience, Walton chose not to wear the usual tango attire of a slit-sided skirt and performed in an ankle-length dress with a small train, which she held in her hand as she danced. The performance demonstrated the tango figures of El Paseo, La Marcha, El Corte, Paseo con Golpe, La Media Luna, Las Tijeras, La Rueda and El Ocho. This was a typical selection for the period, when the dance was not yet formalised and dance styles varied widely between different performers. Mary indicated that she was delighted by the tango demonstration, though a report in the New-York Tribune noted that George V showed little reaction to any dance except for a grotesque solo dance by Mouvet. The dance demonstration lasted for around 45 minutes, longer than scheduled, and led Mouvet and Walton to be late for a performance that night at London's Alhambra Theatre of Variety.

== Ball ==
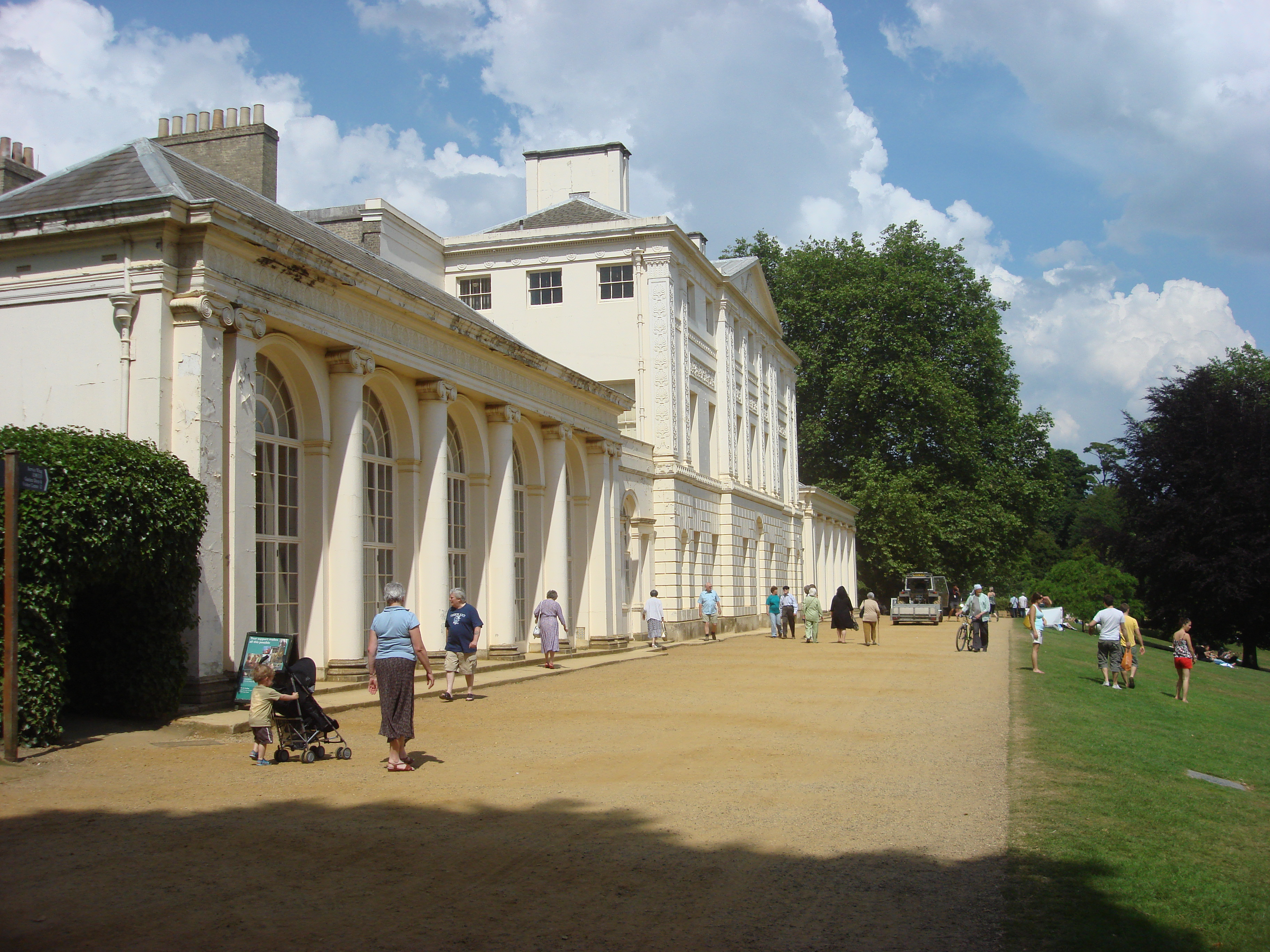
The terrace at Kenwood House in 2009

That evening some 2,000 people attended a ball at Kenwood House. Attendees included the peers the Duke and Duchess of Roxburghe (who also brought with them a large party that had dined at their house), the Duke and Duchess of Rutland and her daughter Lady Diana Manners, the Duke and Duchess of Manchester and their son Lord Charles Montagu, Katherine, dowager Duchess of Westminster, Constance, Duchess of Westminster, the Duke and Duchess of Wellington, the Marquess and Marchioness of Salisbury and their daughter Lady Mary Cecil, the Marquess and Marchioness of Crewe and the Earl and Countess of Lonsdale. It was also attended by the prime minister H. H. Asquith, the speaker of the House of Commons James Lowther and his wife and daughter, the German ambassador Karl Max, Prince Lichnowsky, the Italian ambassador the Marquis Guglielmo Imperiali and the Spanish ambassador Alfonso Merry del Val.

The orchestra, brought from Vienna, was sited in the house's orangery and supper was served in a marquee on the south terrace. The marquee, which overlooked the lake, was decorated with coloured draperies and gold mouldings. During the ball a tango was danced.

== Later events ==
The ball was one of the last major social events put on by Michael. He lost his fortune, derived largely from a mineral water plant in Georgia, to the Bolsheviks during the Russian Revolution. He became dependent on an allowance from the diamond magnate and British Army officer Sir Harold Augustus Wernher, who had married Zia in 1917. He was forced to relinquish the lease on Kenwood House that same year. The coming-out ball for Zia and Wernher's daughter Georgina in 1937 was also attended by the reigning monarch, George VI (son of George V and Mary).

Nada married Prince George of Battenberg in 1916. Michael's wife died in 1927, and he died in 1929.

== See also ==
- Duchess of Richmond's ball, held on the eve of the 1815 Battle of Quatre Bras
- Devonshire House Ball of 1897, a similar gathering of society figures in London
- 1903 ball in the Winter Palace, characterised as the last great ball of Imperial Russia
