= Self-Portrait with Two Circles =

Painting by Rembrandt, 1665–1669

- Zelfportret met twee cirkels (Dutch)
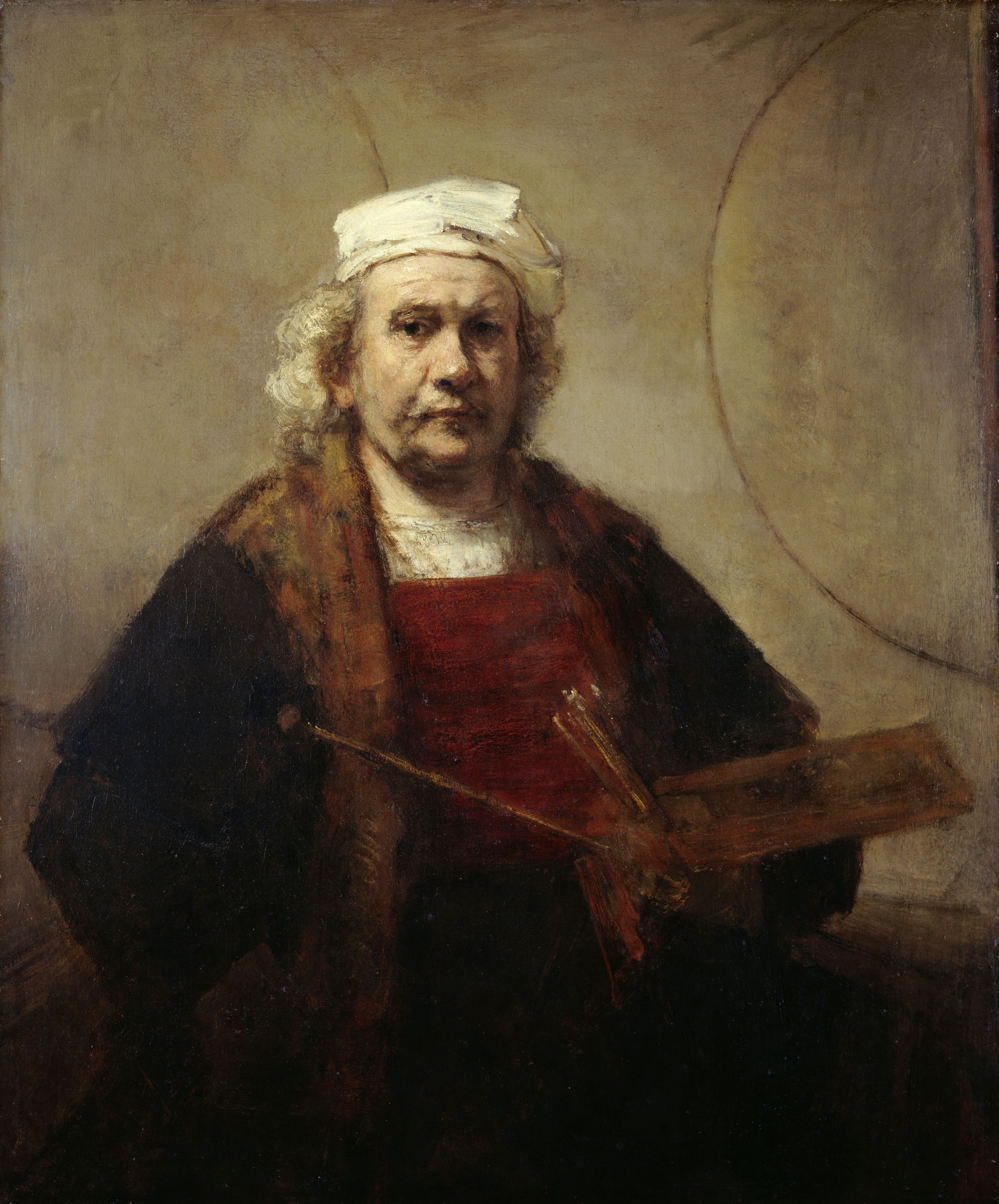
- Artist: Rembrandt
- Year: c. 1665–1669
- Catalogue: IV 26
- Medium: Oil on canvas
- Dimensions: 114.3 cm × 94 cm (45.0 in × 37 in)
- Location: Kenwood House, London; 51.5713848°N 0.1675723°W
- Owner: Iveagh Bequest
- Accession: 57
- Website: https://www.english-heritage.org.uk/visit/places/kenwood/history-stories-kenwood/rembrandt-self-portrait/

Self-Portrait with Two Circles is an oil-on-canvas painting by the Dutch artist Rembrandt, painted c. 1665–1669, one of over 40 painted self-portraits by Rembrandt.

In the portrait, Rembrandt holds his palette, brushes, and maulstick. The painting is notable for its monumentality and the enigmatic background consisting of a shallow space with the fragments of two circles.

== Description ==
Self-Portrait with Two Circles is one of more than 40 self-portraits Rembrandt painted (as well as a similar number in other media) and one of a number of depictions in several media dating at least from 1629 that show him at work drawing, etching, or painting. He wears a fur-lined robe, beneath which is a red garment. On his head is a white hat, similar to that worn in several other late self-portraits.

X-rays show Rembrandt had presented himself as working on a canvas suggested by the vertical line at the far right of the portrait.

Unlike other late self-portraits, in Self-Portrait with Two Circles, Rembrandt, with one hand on his hip, appears confrontational and even defiant. The impression is that of a master solemnly asserting his genius.

== Technique and process ==
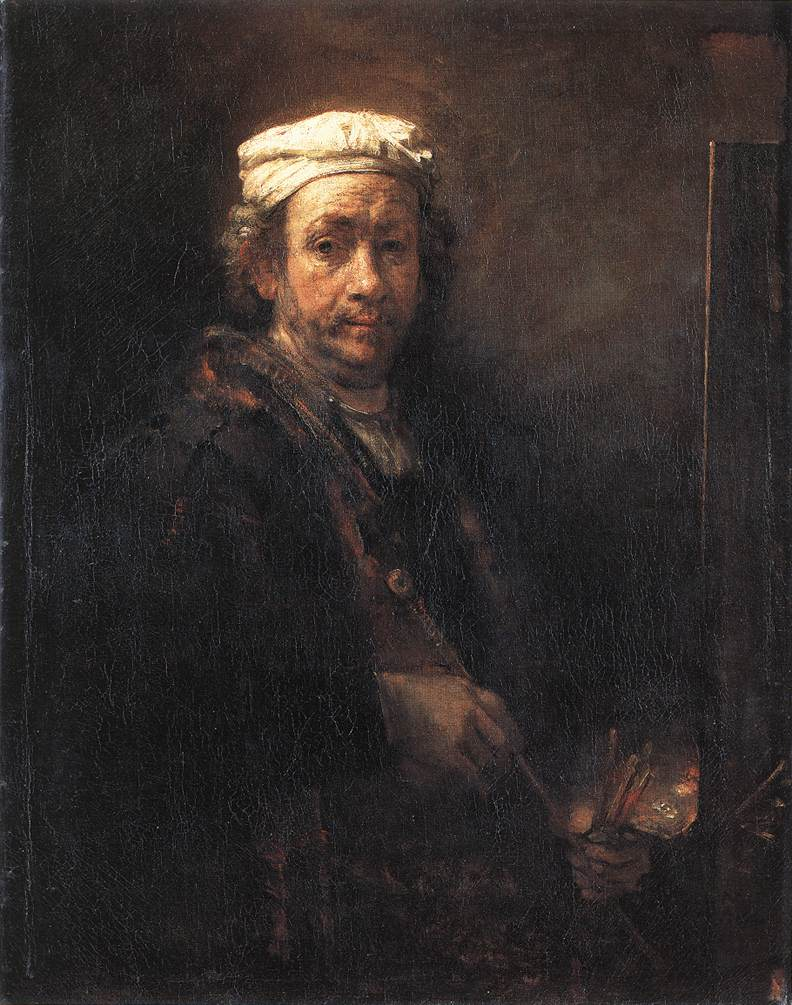
Rembrandt. Self-Portrait at the Easel, 1660. Oil on canvas, 110.9 × 90.6 cm. Louvre. Here, too, the artist is seen at work, wearing a white cap.

As in many of the artist's late works, the painting is characterized by an improvisational handling, with details that read as unfinished. There are areas, such as the face and the right side of the hat, where a gray layer of paint has been used as a tonal middle ground, upon which bold lights and rich dark accents have been added, sometimes with rapid strokes of paint applied wet-into-wet. In several places, Rembrandt "drew" into the paint while it was still wet, incising lines in the mustache, left eyebrow, and shirt collar. The hands, palette, brushes, and fur lining of the artist's gown, or tabbaard, were painted with great rapidity. Whether Rembrandt intended to more fully finish these areas is not known, but the painting's overall forcefulness renders concern for its completion superfluous. Subsequent generations of artists appreciated the unfinished passages: Joshua Reynolds commented on its "very unfinished manner", but found it "admirable for its colour and effect", and Jean-Honoré Fragonard made a painted copy of it. That Rembrandt may not have considered the work complete is suggested by the omission of his signature and date, unusual for a self-portrait by the artist. Alternatively, it is possible that Rembrandt's intent was to leave an iconic biographical image for posterity, more profound than a traditional self-portrait. In this vein, a comparison to Titian's late "unfinished" self-portrait in the Gemäldegalerie, Berlin, which Self-Portrait with Two Circles resembles, is appropriate.

Some of the apparently unfinished passages were intended as revisions to a previous conception: the body was originally turned farther to the viewer's right, with Rembrandt's arm raised so that he would be portrayed painting on a canvas at the edge of the picture while holding additional brushes in his left hand. The subsequent alterations, including the repainting of his left hand on his hip, reduced the animation of the figure and increased its sense of monumentality. The most richly elaborated areas are the background and head, with the latter constructed of many nuanced colors, thickly painted, and imparting a dynamic realism. In contrast to the impasted areas are the eye sockets, painted with subtle glazes, one eye in shadow and the effect enigmatic.

== Circles ==
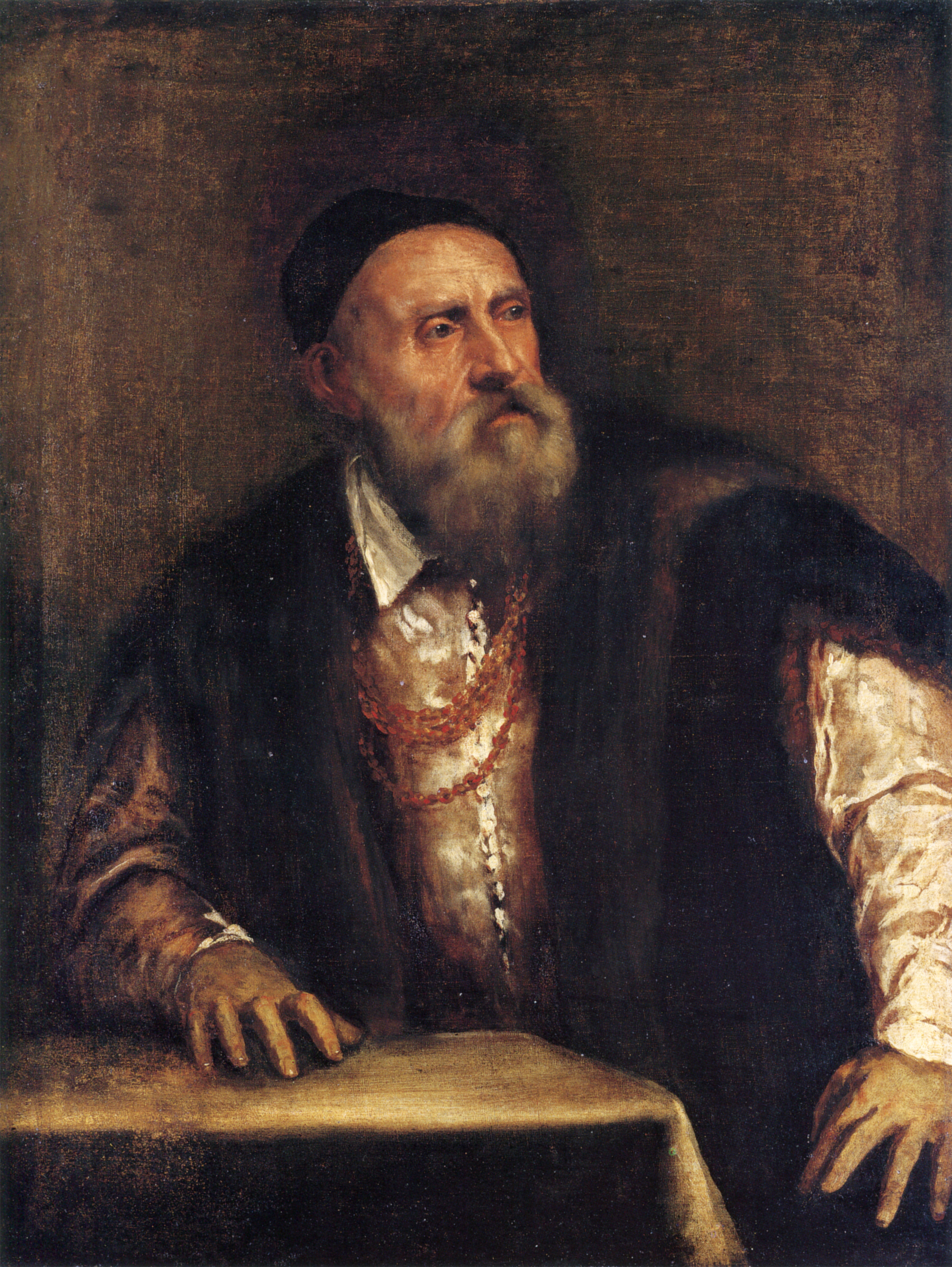
Titian's Berlin self-portrait, oil on canvas (c. 1546–47). Gemäldegalerie, Berlin. Rembrandt was inspired by the suggestive brushwork of Titian's late work.

The meaning of the background has generated much speculation. The flat surface behind Rembrandt has been interpreted as either a wall or stretched canvas. Among the theories explaining the significance of the arced lines is that they are drawn on a wall, or that they represent hemispheres in a map of the world, a common design feature of Dutch homes; however, the circles contain no geographical references and are placed rather far apart. It has been suggested that the circles represent the rota aristotelis – the Aristotelian idea of the true form of the world – or have kabbalistic significance. It has also been theorized that the circles symbolize perfection of artistic skill, as in the story of the Italian master Giotto being summoned by the pope to demonstrate his artistry and responding by drawing a perfect circle in a single motion. A similar story involves Apelles, court painter to Alexander the Great, and fellow artist Protogenes, each engaged in drawing "perfect" lines. That the circles may serve a compositional function, that of geometric structure, is also a possibility.

Against the "map" theory of Benjamin P. J. Broos and Jeanne Porter, Saskia Beranek writes, "The problem with this interpretation, according to the detractors (who include Ernst van de Wetering and the Rembrandt Research Project) is that the circles are too far apart to represent the two circles of a map, and that the wrinkling and curling of maps on walls seen in other paintings is not present."

Reviewing the literature that attempts to explain the pair of inscribed circles, Perry Chapman poses an "alternative reading" to the iconographic focus, which "ignore[s] the visual effect as a whole." According to Jan Gerrit van Gelder, Chapman notes, the circles would be "17th-century cabalistic symbols representing the perfection of God" "To read them as purely abstract forms," however, "would be out of keeping with Dutch painting in general, and Rembrandt's in particular," writes Chapman. Jan Emmans "reads them emblematically, ideal of painting as a combination of inborn talent, theory, and practice—ingenium, ars, and usus or exercitatio." Likewise, Chapman notes how Kurt Bauch and Henri van de Waal speak of "perfectly drawn circles." Chapman notes, however, that the circles are actually "two partial circles—not the single perfect circle crucial to the anecdote. Moreover, the image of a steady drawing hand seems hardly the message of this work's extreme painterliness."

Rather, Chapman writes, the Kenwood self-portrait "is concerned with practice. Not only does Rembrandt present himself in working attire in his studio, but his broad, insistent, rough technique calls attention to the painting process. The portrait reaffirms his identity as anchored in the mastery of his art."

== See also ==
- List of paintings by Rembrandt
