= Portrait of Nicolaes Ruts =

1631 painting by Rembrandt

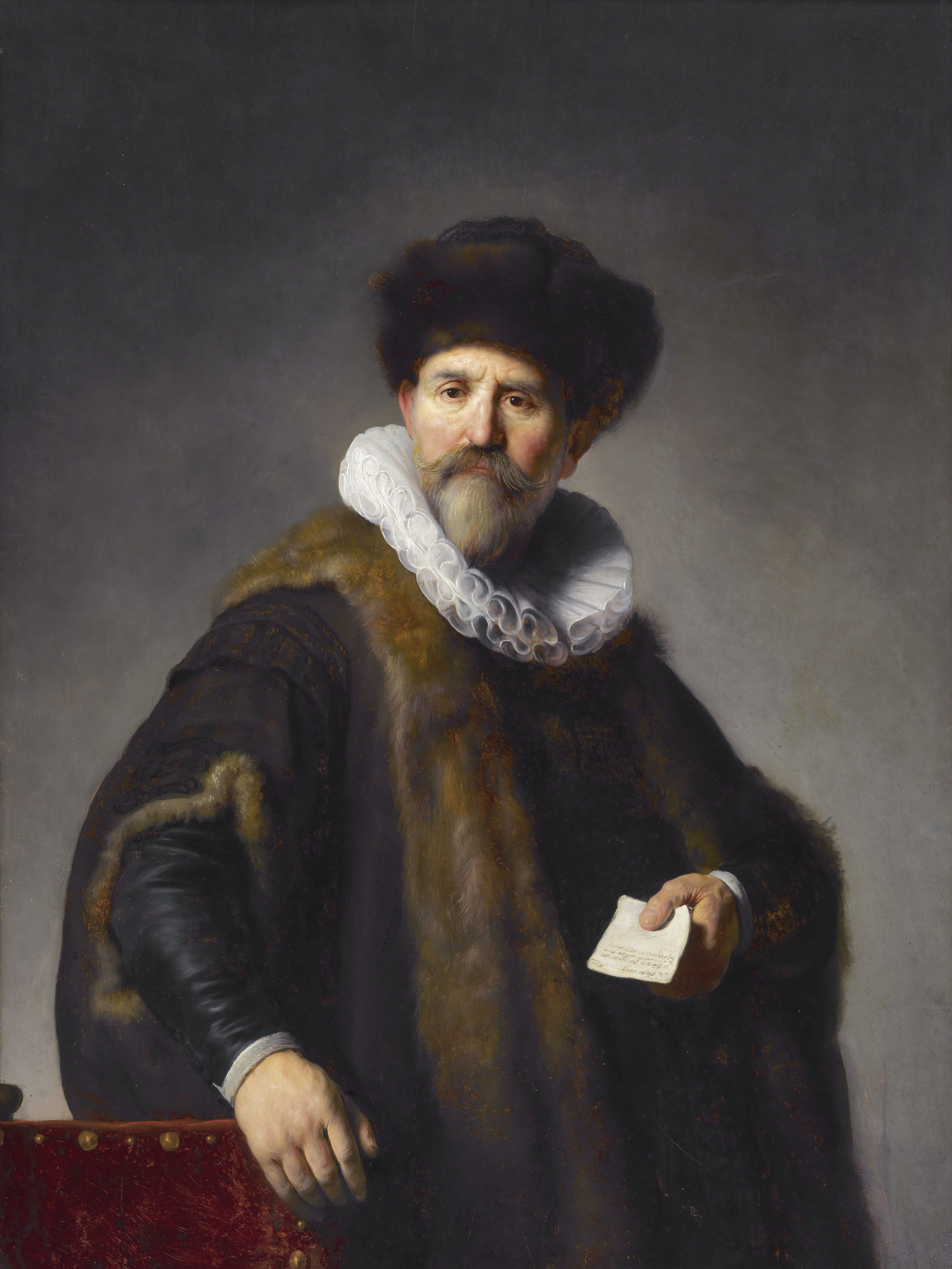
Portrait of Ruts, 1631

Portrait of Nicolaes Ruts (1573–1638) is a 1631 painting by the Dutch artist Rembrandt van Rijn. It is one of Rembrandt's earliest commissioned pieces and helped launch his career as a portrait painter. The painting is housed in the Frick Collection.

The portrait is painted in oil on a mahogany panel, and measures 46 x 34 in (116.8 x 87.3 cm). In it, Ruts is depicted wearing a type of robe (known as a tabbaard) with a sable lining; a translucent neck ruff; and Russian ushanka hat. He holds a note in his proper left hand and looks directly at the viewer; his right hand rests on the back of a red chair. The text of the note Ruts is holding in the portrait is illegible, except for the date of 1631.

Nicolaes Ruts (1573–1638), the subject of the portrait, was born in Cologne and became an Amsterdam Mennonite merchant who frequently traded with the Russian colony at Arkhangelsk. Rembrandt painted the portrait of him in 1631, when Ruts was 58 years old. As a merchant, Ruts was not particularly successful, and filed for bankruptcy shortly before he died. The portrait may have been commissioned by his daughter Susanna who, together with her husband, was quite a successful Amsterdam merchant.

== Provenance ==
- Susanna Ruts, Amsterdam, and descendants.
- By 1799, Joost Romswinckel, Leyden and The Hague.
- After 1817, Anthony Meynts; his sale, Amsterdam, July 15, 1823 (lot 107) as Portrait of a Man; to
- Brondgeest (possibly as agent for Dutch royal family);
- Willem II, king of the Netherlands; his sale, The Hague, August 12, 1850 (lot 86), as Portrait d'un Rabbin; to
- Weimer, The Hague
- Adrian Hope; his sale, Christie's, June 30, 1894 (lot 57); to
- Agnew's
- Joseph Ruston, Monk's Manor, Lincoln; his sale, Christie's, May 21/23, 1898 (lot 95)
- Colnaghi; to
- Comte Boni de Castellane, Paris (via E. Fischof); to
- J. P. Morgan, before 1903 until 1913; his principal heir J. P. Morgan Jr. until 1943
- Loan Exhibition of the J. Pierpont Morgan Collection, Metropolitan Museum of Art, 1912-1914
- Paintings from the J.P. Morgan Collection, Knoedler Gallery, 1943
- The Frick Collection, 1943 (via Knoedler's).

== See also ==
- List of paintings by Rembrandt
