= Leonora Hughes =

American dancer

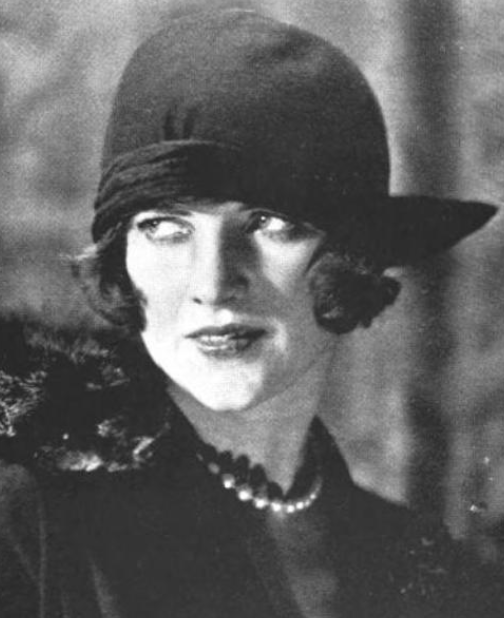
- Leonora Hughes, photographed by Edward Steichen for Vanity Fair (1924)
- Born: Leonora Marion Hughes; March 31, 1897; Chicago, Illinois
- Died: February 1978; Buenos Aires, Argentina
- Other names: Leonore Hughes, Lenora Basualdo
- Occupation(s): Dancer, socialite

Leonora Marion Hughes (March 31, 1897 – February 1978), also seen as Leonore Hughes, was an American dancer, one of the partners of Belgian dancer Maurice Mouvet.

== Early life and education ==
Leonora Hughes was born in Chicago and raised in New York City, one of the eight children of Thomas Hughes and Mary McGuire Hughes. Her parents were Irish immigrants to the United States.

== Career ==
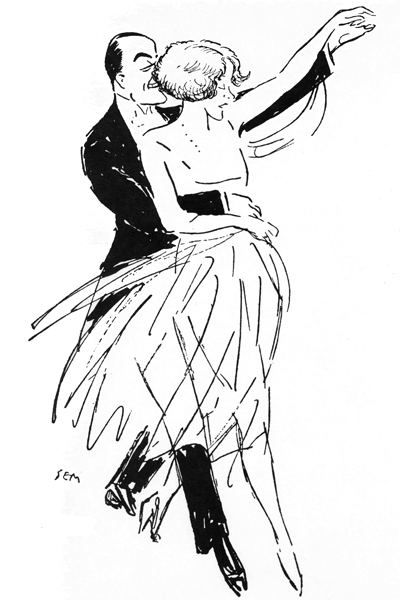
A drawing of Leonora Hughes and Maurice Mouvet by Sem, originally published in 1923

Hughes was a telephone operator as a young woman. She was the third dance partner of Maurice Mouvet, beginning after his divorce from Florence Walton, until Hughes retired from dancing to marry in 1925. "Her principal qualification as a partner was her ability to meet the moods of Maurice," recalled a 1927 article, "and their work together was remarkable". They toured together for several years in Europe and North America, and appeared on Broadway together in the musical Good Morning Dearie (1922).

Hughes was considered a stylish beauty in the 1920s and 1930s. Edward Steichen photographed her in 1923, for Vogue magazine, and in 1924 for Vanity Fair. She appeared in two silent films: The Indestructible Wife (1919) starring Alice Brady, and The Rejected Woman (1924) starring Bela Lugosi and Alma Rubens.

== Personal life ==
Alfonso of Spain and his cousin, Duke Ferdinand of Dúrcal, both wooed Hughes in the early 1920s. In 1925, Hughes married wealthy Argentinian Carlos Ortiz Basualdo at St. Patrick's Cathedral in New York City. They had two children, Carlos Fermín and María Matilde. They hosted international visitors, including British princes, John J. Pershing, and Noël Coward, at the Basualdo family's cattle ranch near Lake Nahuel Huapi. Her husband died in a speedboat accident in 1935. She died in 1978, in Buenos Aires, at the age of 80.
