= Sold (1915 film) =

1915 film

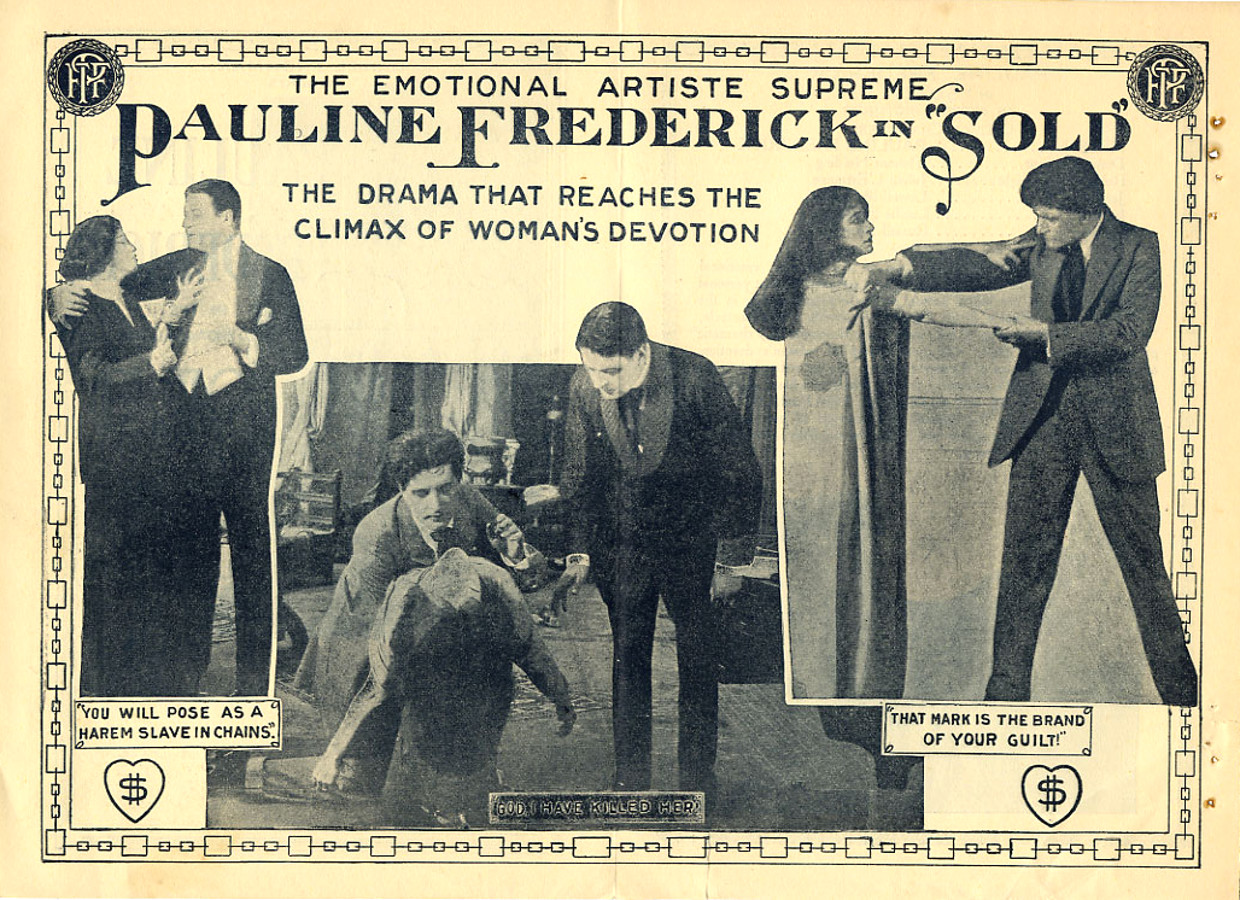
- Advertisement
- Directed by: Edwin S. Porter; Hugh Ford
- Based on: Sold by George Erastov
- Produced by: Daniel Frohman
- Starring: Pauline Frederick; Thomas Holding
- Production company: Famous Players–Lasky
- Distributed by: Paramount Pictures
- Release dates: August 5, 1915; March 30, 1919 (U.S. re-release)
- Country: United States
- Languages: Silent; English intertitles

Sold is a 1915 American silent drama film produced by Famous Players–Lasky and distributed by Paramount Pictures. Based on George Erastov's play of the same name (which was an adaptation of the Henri Bernstein French play Le Secret), the film starred stage actress Pauline Frederick and was directed by Hugh Ford and Edwin S. Porter. The film was re-released in 1919 by Paramount.

== Cast ==
- Pauline Frederick as Helen
- Thomas Holding as Donald Bryant
- Julian L'Estrange as Robert Wainwright
- Lowell Sherman as Johnson
- Lucille Fursman as Lucy
- Russell Bassett as Dolbeare

== Production ==
An exterior for Sold was filmed at the entrance of the Metropolitan Museum of Art.

== Preservation ==
Sold is currently presumed lost. In February of 2021, the film was cited by the National Film Preservation Board on their Lost U.S. Silent Feature Films list.

== See also ==
- List of lost films
