= Julian L'Estrange =

British actor

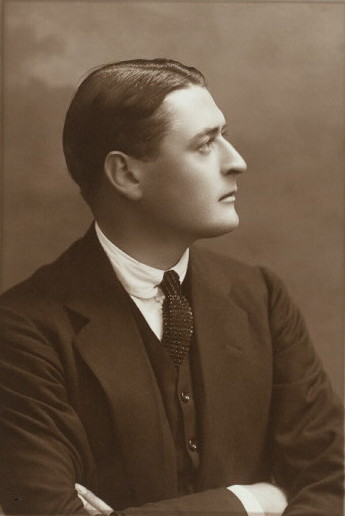
- Born: Julian Boyle; 6 August 1880; Weston-super-Mare, England
- Died: 22 October 1918 (aged 38); New York City, New York, U.S.
- Occupation: Actor
- Years active: 1902–18
- Spouse: Constance Collier (m. 1905)

Julian L'Estrange (born Julian Boyle; 6 August 1880 – 22 October 1918) was an English-born stage actor who later made a handful of silent films for Paramount Pictures. He married fellow performer Constance Collier at All Saints Church in London on 25 November 1905. They were a well-known married stage couple on both sides of the Atlantic. He died in the Spanish Influenza Pandemic of 1918. Collier talks about him in her 1929 autobiography Harlequinade. She never remarried.

Born in England, L'Estrange came to the United States in September 1908, with his first stage performances in America coming in Myself Bettina and The Chaperone. His Broadway debut was in Imprudence (1902), and his last Broadway play was An Ideal Husband (1918). L'Estrange acted on film in The Girl with the Green Eyes, Zaza, and Daybreak. He died of pneumonia on 22 October 1918 after having had Spanish Influenza.

== Partial stage roles ==
Broadway only

- Imprudence (November 1902 – January 1903)
- Myself – Bettina (October – November 1908)
- Suzanne (December 1910 – February 1911)
- White Magic (January–February 1912) (written by Roi Cooper Megrue)
- The Paper Chase (November–December 1912)
- The Spy (January–March 1913)
- Her First Divorce (May 1913)
- The Yellow Ticket (January–June 1914)
- The Merchant of Venice (May 1916)Shakespeare 300th

== Filmography ==
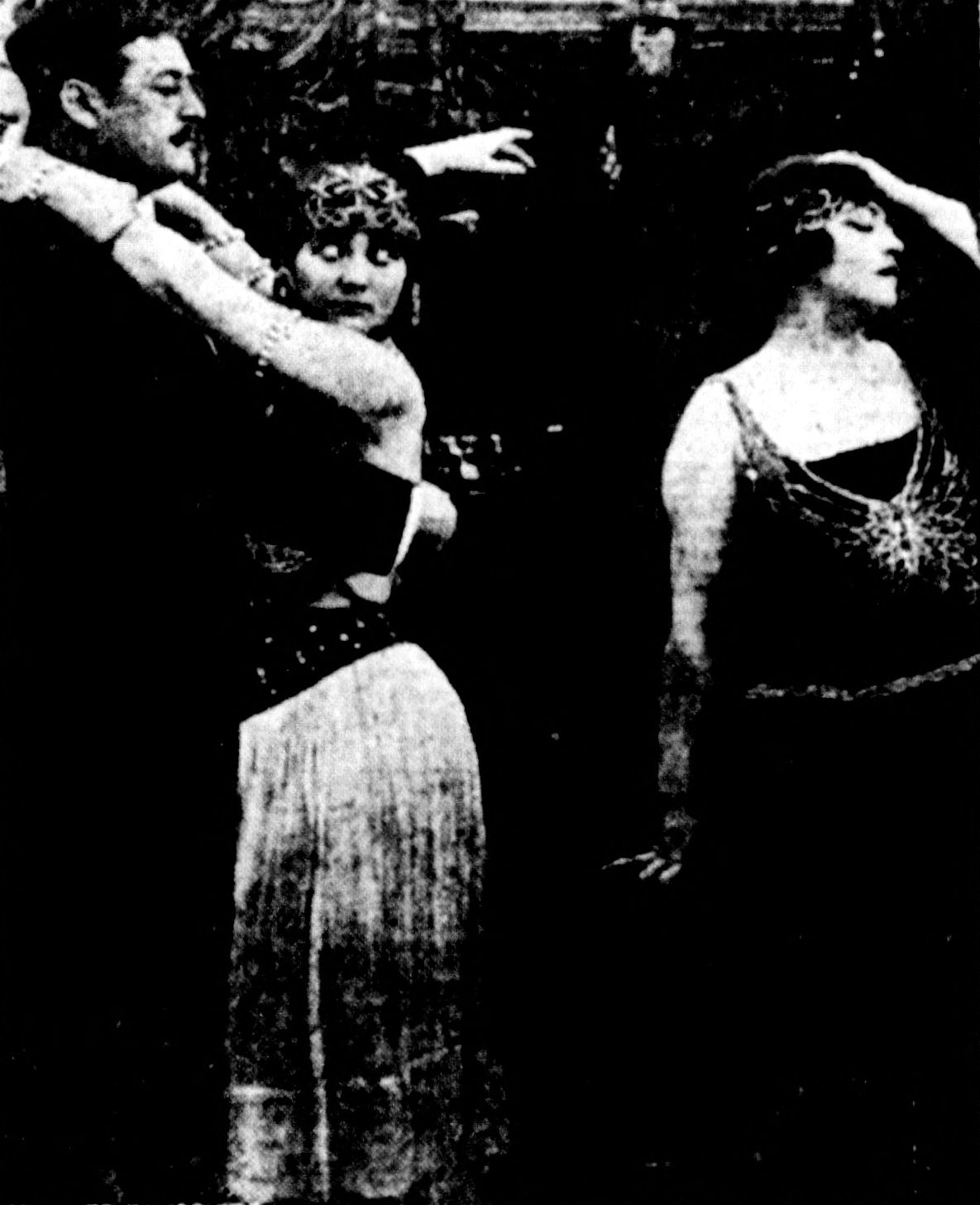
L'Estrange, Betty Blythe (uncredited) and Pauline Frederick in Bella Donna (1915)

- The Morals of Marcus (1915)
- Sold (1915)
- Zaza (1915)
- Bella Donna (1915)
- The Girl with the Green Eyes (1916 short)
- The Quest of Life (1916)
- Daybreak (1918)
