= The Quest of Life =

1916 film by Ashley Miller

- Directed by: Ashley Miller
- Screenplay by: Gabrielle Enthoven; Edmund Goulding; Ashley Miller
- Starring: Florence Walton; Julian L'Estrange; Royal Byron; Daniel Burke; Russell Bassett
- Cinematography: Walter Stradling
- Production company: Famous Players Film Company
- Distributed by: Paramount Pictures
- Release date: September 25, 1916
- Running time: 50 minutes
- Country: United States
- Language: English

The Quest of Life is a 1916 American drama silent film directed by Ashley Miller and written by Gabrielle Enthoven, Edmund Goulding and Ashley Miller. The film stars Florence Walton, Julian L'Estrange, Royal Byron, Daniel Burke and Russell Bassett. The film was released on September 25, 1916, by Paramount Pictures. It is currently considered a lost film.

The film is notable for featuring actor Rudolph Valentino in one of his earliest screen appearances as an extra in a dance-hall scene prior to his rise to fame.

== Cast ==
- Florence Walton as Ellen Young
- Julian L'Estrange as Alec Mapleton
- Royal Byron as Percy
- Daniel Burke as Baronti
- Russell Bassett as Ellen's father
- Maurice Mouvet as Maurice Breton
