= Apache (dance) =

Parisian dance

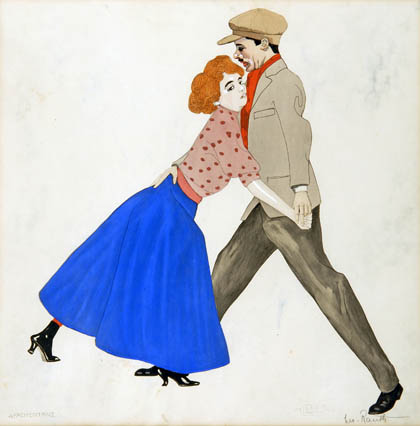
Apachentanz by Leo Rauth (1911)

Apache (French: [a.paʃ]), or La Danse Apache, Bowery Waltz, Apache Turn, Apache Dance and Tough Dance is a highly dramatic dance associated in popular culture with Parisian street culture at the beginning of the 20th century. The name of the dance is pronounced ah-PAHSH, not uh-PATCH-ee. In fin de siècle Paris young members of street gangs were labelled Apaches by the press because of the ferocity of their savagery towards one another, a name taken from the North American Indian tribe, Apache.

The dance is sometimes said to reenact a violent "discussion" between a pimp and a prostitute. It includes mock slaps and punches, the man picking up and throwing the woman to the ground, or lifting and carrying her while she struggles or feigns unconsciousness. Thus, the dance shares many features with the theatrical discipline of stage combat. In some examples, the woman may fight back.

== Origin ==
In 1908, dancers Maurice Mouvet and Max Dearly began to visit the low bars frequented by Apaches in a search for inspiration for new dances. They formulated the new dance from moves seen there and gave to it the name Apache. Max Dearly first performed it in 1908 in Paris at the Café des Ambassadeurs and Maurice in Ostend at the Kursaal. A short while later, in the summer of 1908, Maurice and his partner Leona performed the dance at Maxim's, and Max Dearly made an even bigger impact with it, partnered with Mistinguett, in the Moulin Rouge show, La Revue du Moulin. Mistinguett described the dance as, "an alternation between caresses and struggles, brutality and sensual tenderness."

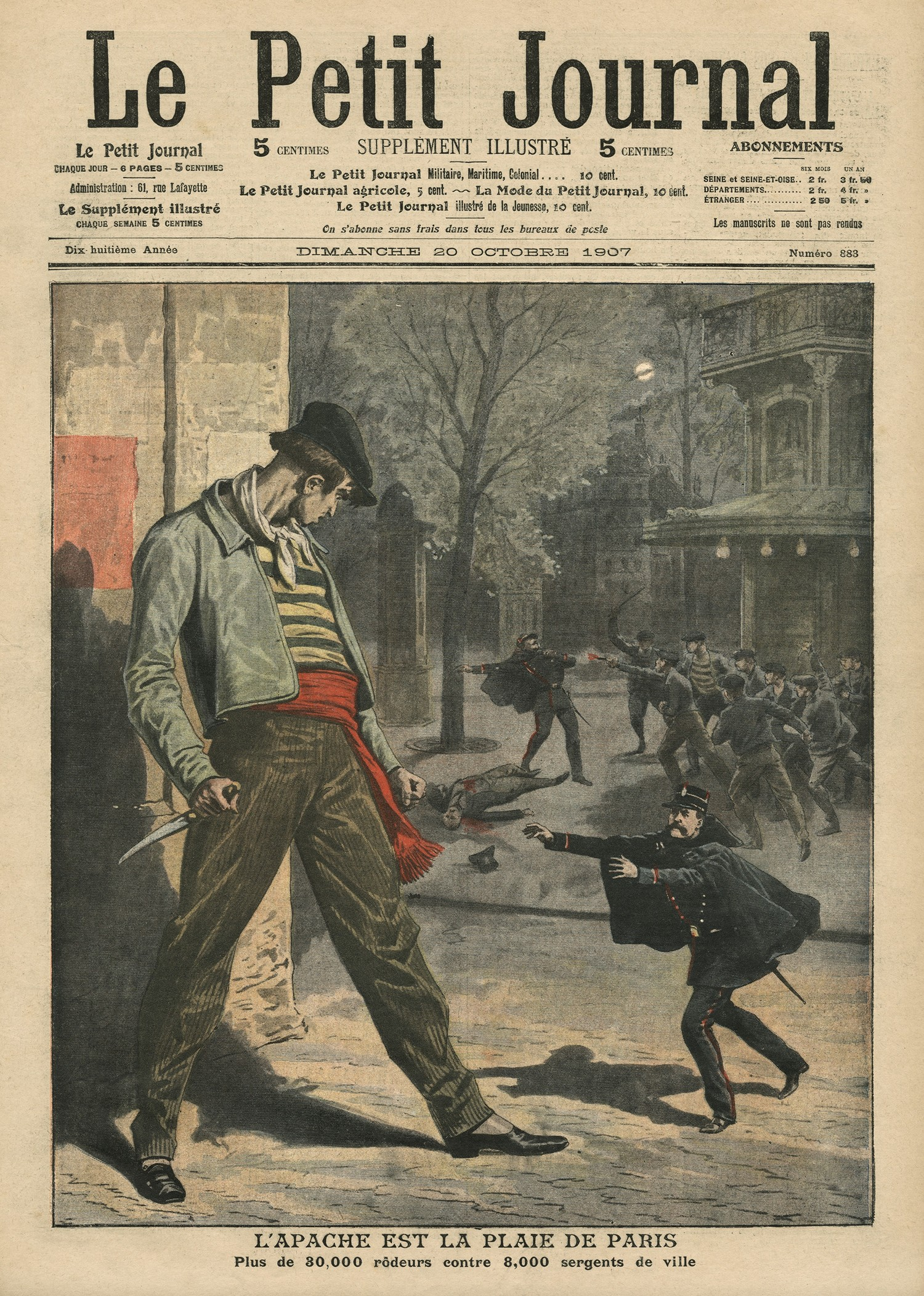
Cover page of "Le Petit Journal", 20 October 1907. "L'apache est la plaie de Paris."

== Music ==
The music most associated with the Apache dance is the "Valse des Rayons" from the ballet Le Papillon, composed by Jacques Offenbach in 1861. An arrangement by Charles Dubourg, titled "Valse Chaloupée" was used by Mistinguett and Max Dearly when performing the dance at the Moulin Rouge in 1908. Other arrangements of the same waltz soon followed, including "L'Amour de L'Apache" in 1909, arranged by Augustus C. Ely. An early example of original music composed for the Apache dance is "Valse Apache," composed by Fernand Le Borne for the 1908 silent film L'Empreinte ou la main rouge in which Mistinguett and Max Dearly performed the dance. The sheet music for L'Empreinte contains several cues to the movements in the Apache dance.

== Depictions ==
A 1902 Edison movie of two Bowery dancers, Kid Foley and Sailor Lil doing a Tough dance which is similar in style, survives.

The 1904 Pathé film Danse des Apaches directed by Gaston Velle contains an early Apache dance performed by acrobatic dancers from La Scala, Paris.

In The Mothering Heart, a 1913 short drama film directed by D. W. Griffith, an Apache dance is shown in a restaurant cabaret.

The famous French 10-part 7-hour silent film Les Vampires (1915, re-released on DVD in 2005) about an Apache gang "Les Vampires" contains a number of Apache dance scenes performed by real street Apache dancers, rather than actors. A notable detail is that during part of the waltz the man holds firmly onto the woman's hair, rather than her body.

Parisian Love (1925) shows Clara Bow as an Apache dancer, with the dance itself being the first scene in the film.

Ivor Novello performs an Apache dance in the British silent film The Rat (1925).

The American film The Sunshine of Paradise Alley (1926) contains an Apache dance.

In Hot Heels (1928) an Apache dance is performed by Glenn Tryon and Patsy Ruth Miller.

In the 1929 Mickey Mouse cartoon Mickey's Follies, a rooster and hen perform the dance, interrupting it partway through so the hen can rush to her nest and lay an egg.

In Doughboys (1930), Buster Keaton in drag dances the woman's part in an Apache dance.

In The Apache Kid (1930), a Krazy Kat cartoon, Columbia's male version of Krazy and his girlfriend, Kitty, perform the dance, interrupting it repeatedly so they can puff at cigarettes.

In the 1930 Van Beuren cartoon Stone Age Stunts, part of their Aesop's Fables series, a pair of Stone Age mice perform the dance at a club.

In Charlie Chaplin's City Lights (1931) the Tramp sees an Apache dance in a nightclub and, thinking it is real, interrupts it.

The landmark 1932 Hollywood film musical Love Me Tonight features the song "Poor Apache."

Olive Oyl, Bluto and Popeye do the Apache in Popeye The Sailor 017 - The Dance Contest (1934).

In 1934's Limehouse Blues, nightclub owner Harry Young, George Raft, does an Apache dance with his star performer and lover Tu Tuan Anna Mae Wong.

Also in 1934 the Adagio Dancers, artists Alexis and Dorrano, perform the 'Danse Apache' in a British Pathe short set in a seedy French bar and watched by some "toffs".

In the 1934 Happy Harmonies cartoon Toyland Broadcast, two dolls Apache dance on piano keys, playing the music of "Valse des rayons", and ending when the girl doll throws the boy doll off the piano and against a spittoon.

In the 1935 movie Charlie Chan in Paris, Charlie Chan's agent (played by Dorothy Appleby) is murdered following her performance of an Apache dance.

In the 1936 film The Devil Doll, a pair of the titular dolls perform an Apache dance to the tune of the "Valse des rayons" on a music box.

In the 1936 film Roarin' Lead, an entry in Republic's Three Mesquiteers series of B-Westerns, a group of orphans stages a fundraising show in which two of them perform a diminutive version of an Apache dance.

In the 1936 comedy Sons O' Guns, lead actor Joe E. Brown performs in a show where he does a humorous Apache dance.

In the 1936 British comedy, Queen of Hearts, Gracie Fields performed a satirical version of Apache dance, at one point throwing her male partner through a stage window.

In the 1937 serial Blake of Scotland Yard there is an Apache dance sequence set in a café in Paris.

In the British film Okay For Sound (1937) The Crazy Gang witness an Apache dance performed by the dancers Lucienne and Ashour in which the female dancer triumphs.

In the 1937 Silly Symphony Woodland Café a bad-boy spider and a good-girl fly perform a French Apache dance.

In the 1938 Jessie Matthews musical, Sailing Along, the actress delivers a comic Apache stage performance with her co-star Jack Whiting.

In You're in the Army Now (1941) a comic Apache dance is performed to Offenbach's "Valse des rayons".

In The Gang's All Here (1943) Charlotte Greenwood does a short, comic version of an Apache dance.

In Pin Up Girl (1944), Betty Grable, Hermes Pan and Angela Blue perform a musical number dressed as Apache dancers.

In Lake Placid Serenade (1944) Everett McGowan & Ruth Mack - performed the Apache dance on Ice skates named "Cafe de Apache" produced by Republic Films.

In 1944, the opening scene of Die Frau Meiner Träume (The Woman of My Dreams) features Marika Rökk in an acrobatic Apache dance with two men.

In the 1946 film, The Razor's Edge, the main characters visit the Rue de Lappe and experience Apache dancing in a seedy bar.

In the 1947 film Crime Doctor's Gamble, Dr. Robert Ordway visits a seedy Parisian cabaret with an Apache dance sequence.

In the 1949 comedy film Totò Le Mokò, Antonio Lumaconi (Totò Le Mokò, played by Totò) performs an Apache dance with Flora Torrigiani.

An episode of I Love Lucy, "The Adagio" (1951, season one, episode twelve), revolved around Lucy wanting to learn an Apache dance. In another episode, "The French Revue", Fred and Ethel perform an Apache dance in the hopes of starring in an act at the club with a French singer.

In the movie Ma and Pa Kettle on Vacation (1952), Marjorie Main, Ma, takes the woman's part in an Apache dance in a night club, where she plays the aggressive role, throwing about the hapless male dancer.

Apache Dancers Don and Dolores Graham performed the Apache dance in Phantom of the Rue Morgue (1954).

On October 9, 1955, an Apache dance was performed on The Jack Benny Program entitled "Massage and Date with Gertrude". Jack, and his date Gertrude were trying to eat their dinner at a French Nightclub while French Apache dancers kept interrupting their meal. The female dancer actually picked Benny up and tossed him out onto another diner's lap.

Also in 1955, the movie Abbott and Costello Meet the Mummy features an Apache dance in the scene introducing the title characters, where some of the dance interrupted in a predictably slapstick manner.

An example of an Apache dance number is seen in Twentieth Century Fox's film Can-Can (1960) starring Frank Sinatra, Shirley MacLaine and Maurice Chevalier. The number is performed by Shirley MacLaine along with five male dancers as they toss and thrash her about. In this version she fights back and eventually "kills" all five dancers with a knife.

In the golden age Looney Tunes short Louvre Come Back to Me! (1962), a cigarette-smoking couple is depicted performing an Apache inside a basement Paris apartment. Just as the man lifts the woman into the air by her midsection, Pepé Le Pew strolls by an open window while singing Auprès de ma blonde, causing both of them to humorously wilt like flowers from his overpowering stench.

An episode of The Muppet Show, (1976, season one, episode five), included a "French tango" performed by guest Rita Moreno. It was Moreno's idea to perform an Apache dance. Gillian Lynne did the choreography.

An Apache dance also figures in the musical Joseph and the Amazing Technicolor Dreamcoat (1968). When Andrew Lloyd Webber set out to create a musical mix and included a wide variety of musical genres in this show, he added a very French number. When Joseph's brothers are explaining their impoverished state, after selling Joseph into slavery and experiencing the seven lean years, they sing about "Those Canaan Days" reminiscing of better days. Included within that number is an Apache Dance, a brief joyous celebration of what once was and a poignant expression of their regret for their actions.

In the movie Moulin Rouge! (2001), "El Tango de Roxane" is performed as a tango with Apache elements.

In the Apocalyptica video "I Don't Care" (2007), Apache dance is featured in a scene between Adam Gontier and a woman.

In the Pink video "Try" (2013), the singer and male dancer Colt Prattes can be seen performing an interpretation of the Apache dance choreography by The golden Boyz - R J Durrell and Nick Florez - and aerial choreographer Sebastien Stella.
