= Maurice Mouvet =

American dancer (1889–1927)

Mouvet and Walton, 1913

Maurice Oscar Louis Mouvet (March 18, 1889 – May 18, 1927), known by the mononym Maurice, was an American dancer. Born in New York, he moved to London and Paris as a child. In Paris he began dancing in cabarets, cafés and restaurants. After learning to waltz he was offered a dancing role in Vienna where he learnt the Viennese waltz. Mouvet was also an early pioneer in dancing the Argentine tango and the Apache. He met Florence Walton whilst dancing in theatre in New York and they married in 1911. They played a key role in popularising the tango and the foxtrot and danced for European royalty. The couple divorced in 1920. Mouvet suffered from tuberculosis and, after collapsing during a performance in 1922, was advised to move to the mountains to alleviate the condition. He continued to dance and married his new dance partner, Elanor Ambrose, in 1926. He died in Switzerland from tuberculosis.

== Early life and career ==
Mouvet was born in Chelsea, in Brooklyn, New York, on March 18, 1889, to a family of Belgian origin. The family moved to London when Mouvet was 9 and to Paris when he was 14. In Paris Mouvet found work as a car mechanic and chauffeur. His route to work took him past a restaurant and Mouvet persuaded the doorman to let him in to watch the dancing there. Mouvet began professional dance lessons at the age of 15, learning on the job at the Nouveau Cirque, having demonstrated a few cakewalk steps to its manager. During this time Mouvet also danced in cafés and restaurants across Montmartre. He learnt to waltz at the Bal Tabarin cabaret and was offered a job dancing at the Casino Theatre in Vienna, where he studied the Viennese waltz in his spare time. Mouvet afterwards performed in Budapest and Monte Carlo.

Returning to Paris, he danced at the Café de Paris and was an early demonstrator of the Apache dance. His popularity led him to dance before all of the major monarchs of Europe bar the Emperor of Germany. In 1910 he was offered a contract at the Café de Paris in New York where he danced the Viennese waltz and the Argentine tango with partner Madelaide D'Arville. Despite fears of police raids for immorality he introduced the apache to his late night performances.

== With Florence Walton ==
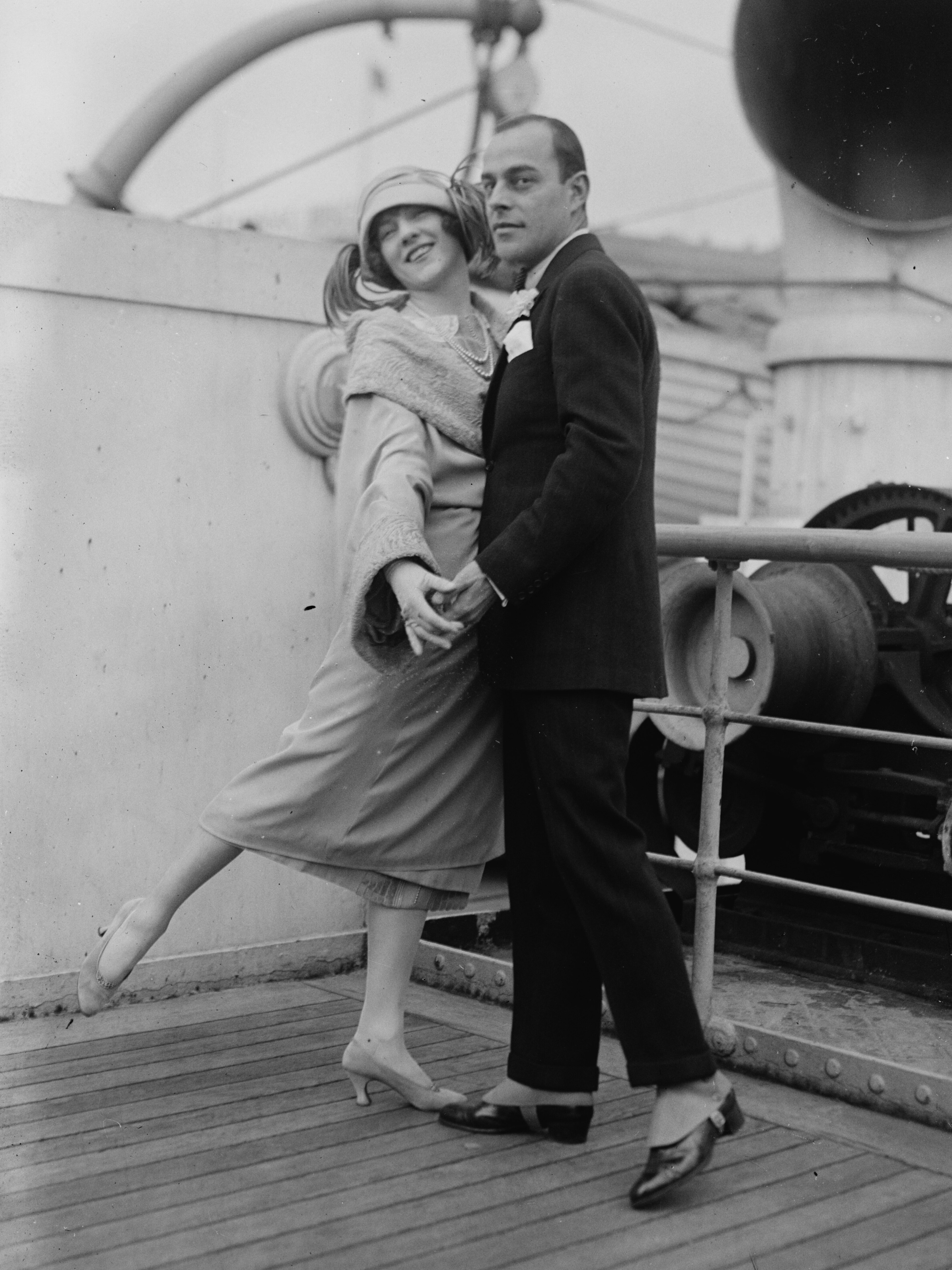
Leonora Hughes and Mouvet on a ship's deck in the 1920s

Mouvet and D'Arville joined the cast of the Broadway musical Over the River but D'Arville abandoned him mid-run and the show's producer Florenz Ziegfeld Jr. introduced him to new partner Florence Walton. With just a half-hour's rehearsal the pair danced their first show. They afterwards became one of the most successful ballroom dance exhibition partnerships and they married in 1911. Mouvet and Walton played a key role in the popularisation of the tango and foxtrot. Three dance songs by three composers were named after Walton in 1912: the "Maurice Glide", "Maurice Tango" and "Maurice Rag". Mouvet did not achieve the fame he might have done with Walton as the couple were always billed as "Florence and Maurice Walton" rather than his real name. The couple claimed to have been the first Americans to entertain troops on the Western Front of the First World War. Mouvet and Walton divorced in 1920.

== Later life ==
Mouvet later danced with Leonora Hughes, until her marriage in 1925, and with Barbara Bennett, sister of actress Constance Bennett, but they parted after less than a year because of a disagreement over money. He wrote the song "The Talmadge Foxtrot" in 1922 for actress Constance Talmadge. Mouvet suffered from tuberculosis and in September 1922 he suffered a haemorrhage during a performance at the Casino in Deauville, France. He was told he might never dance again and advised to move to higher altitude to help his condition. Mouvet married dancing partner Elanor Ambrose in Paris in 1926. The continued to dance at St Moritz until Mouvet moved to the Swiss Alps for his health. He died from tuberculosis at the Hotel Savoy in Lausanne, Switzerland on May 18, 1927.
