= Florence Walton =

American vaudeville dancer and cabaret performer

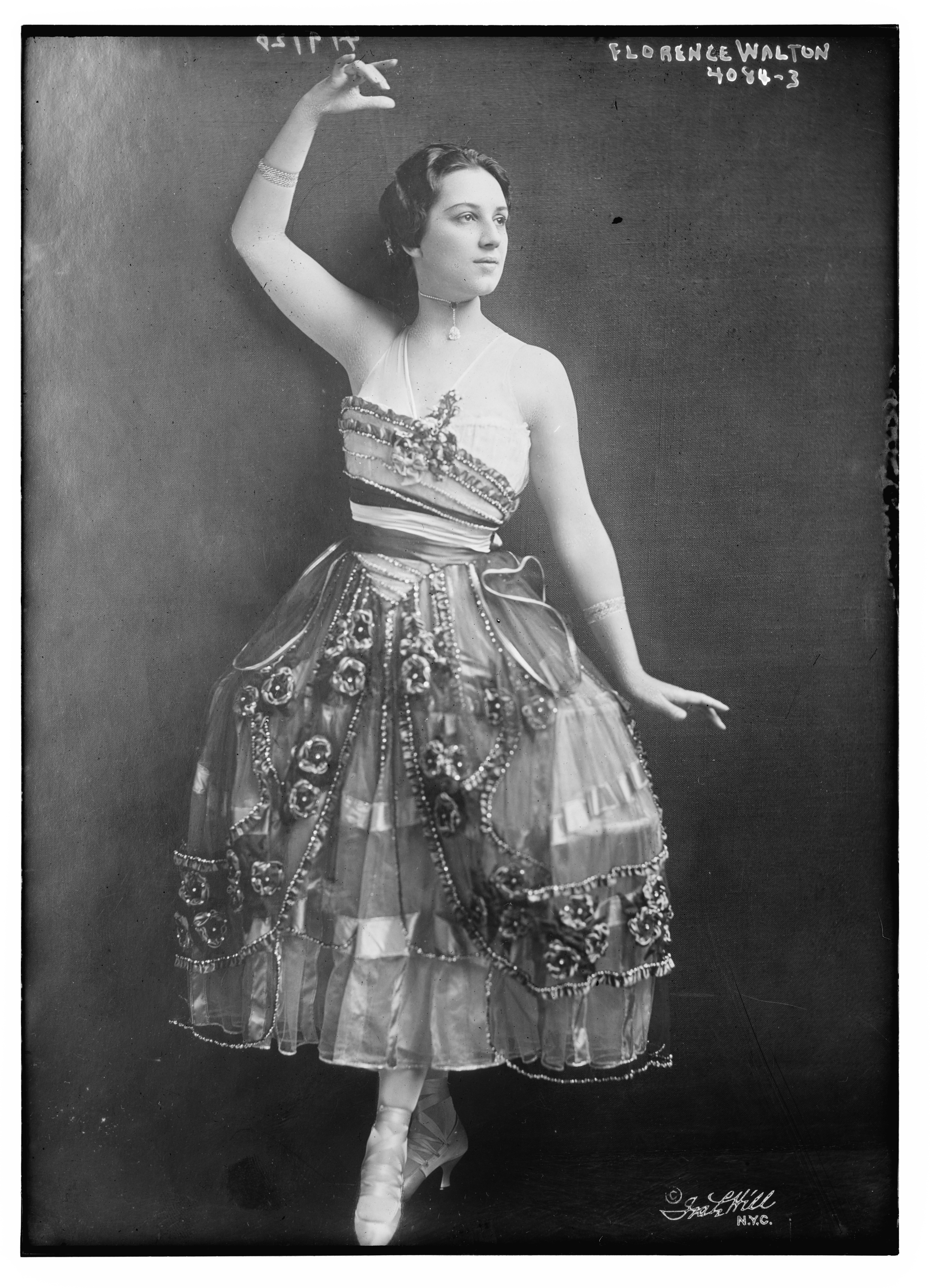
Florence Walton

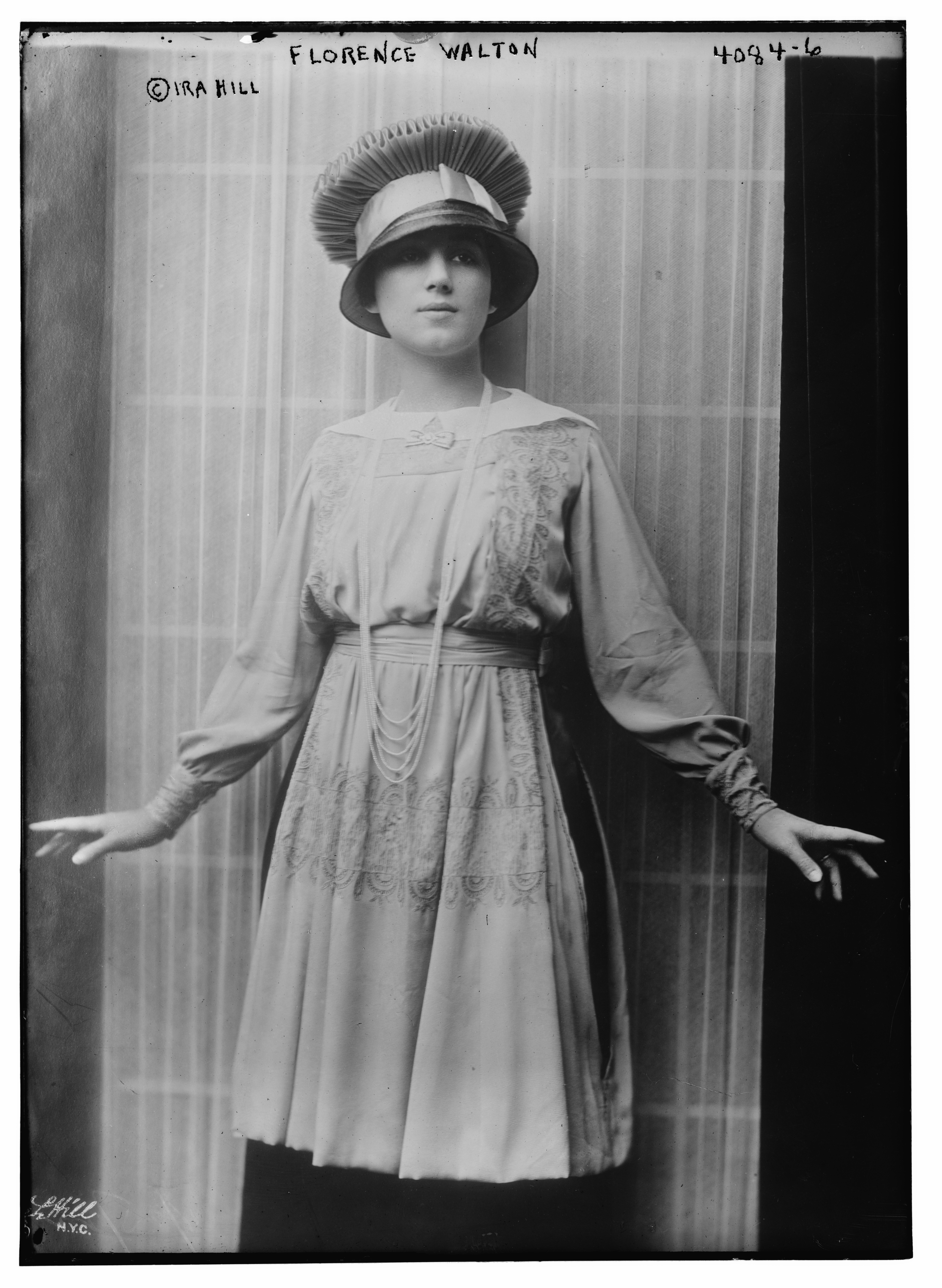
Florence Walton

Florence Walton (1890 in Wilmington, Delaware – January 7, 1981, in New York City, New York) was a vaudeville dancer and cabaret performer in the 1910s and 1920s.

== Early career ==
Born in 1890 in Wilmington, Delaware, Walton made her debut in 1907 in the chorus of the musical comedy The Girl Behind the Counter, produced by Lew Fields. Florence helped popularize the tango, fox-trot and other forms of ballroom dancing with her husband, Swiss-born Maurice Mouvet, and later with Allan Fagan and Leon Leitrim. Walton was introduced to Mouvet by the musical manager Florence Ziegfeld in 1911 when Ziegfeld partnered the two in his production of The Rose Maid. They married that same year and together formed one of the most successful exhibition ballroom teams of their day as well as became two of cabaret's earliest stars. Together they were promoted as Maurice and Walton, or simply "The Waltons." During America's dance mania of the 1910s Florence Walton and Maurice Mouvet were considered as a team second only to The Castles. Walton claimed to be the first American to entertain American troops in the war zone during World War I, claiming in 1914 during a performance with Mouvet at the Palace that during her time abroad she had taught King George V and Queen Mary the tango. The internationally famous couple divorced in 1920.

== Maurice and Walton ==
Walton first came to perform with her husband after Mouvet's dancing partner Medeleine d'Arville eloped with a young Englishman and she was picked as d'Arville's replacement by Florence Ziegfeld. Prior to performing with her husband Maurice Mouvet, Walton was featured in numerous shows including The Soul Kiss in 1908, The Bachelor Belles in 1910, and The Pink Lady in 1911. She later returned to the perform at the Palace with a new dancing partner, Allan Fagan. In October 1920, New York Dramatic Mirror published a rave review of Walton and Fagan's routine claiming Walton "spells and dances class." Walton performed at many famous venues during her career, including New York's Club Ostend and at the New York Hippodrome where she worked with other famous names in vaudeville such as W. C. Fields and Frances White. In 1913, Florence Walton and her husband introduced to vaudeville Luckey Roberts' "Junk Man Rag". In 1916, Florence Walton and her husband starred in the silent film drama The Quest of Life.

== Solo career ==
Florence and Maurice publicly broke up in 1919, divorcing in 1920. The war had strained their professional and marital relationship. From 1917 to 1919 Walton was performing with other dancers while her husband Maurice served in the army medical corps in France, although they would periodically reunite for special performances while he was on duty. Florence and Maurice performed together briefly at the war's end, appearing in The Ziegfeld Follies of 1919 before their divorce in 1920 ended their professional relationship.

Walton went on to perform briefly with the Parisian cabaret dancer Alexandre Vlad before partnering in 1922 with Leon Leitrim, whom she later married. Walton and Leitrim made a name for themselves in Paris before ultimately returning to the United States where they performed in supper clubs and on the Keith vaudeville circuit. Leitrim made a public engagement at the Marigny Theatre in 1923. Soon after Walton and her new husband were in a publicity war with Maurice Mouvet and his new partner Leonora Hughes.
