= Tabbaard =

Item of Dutch clothing

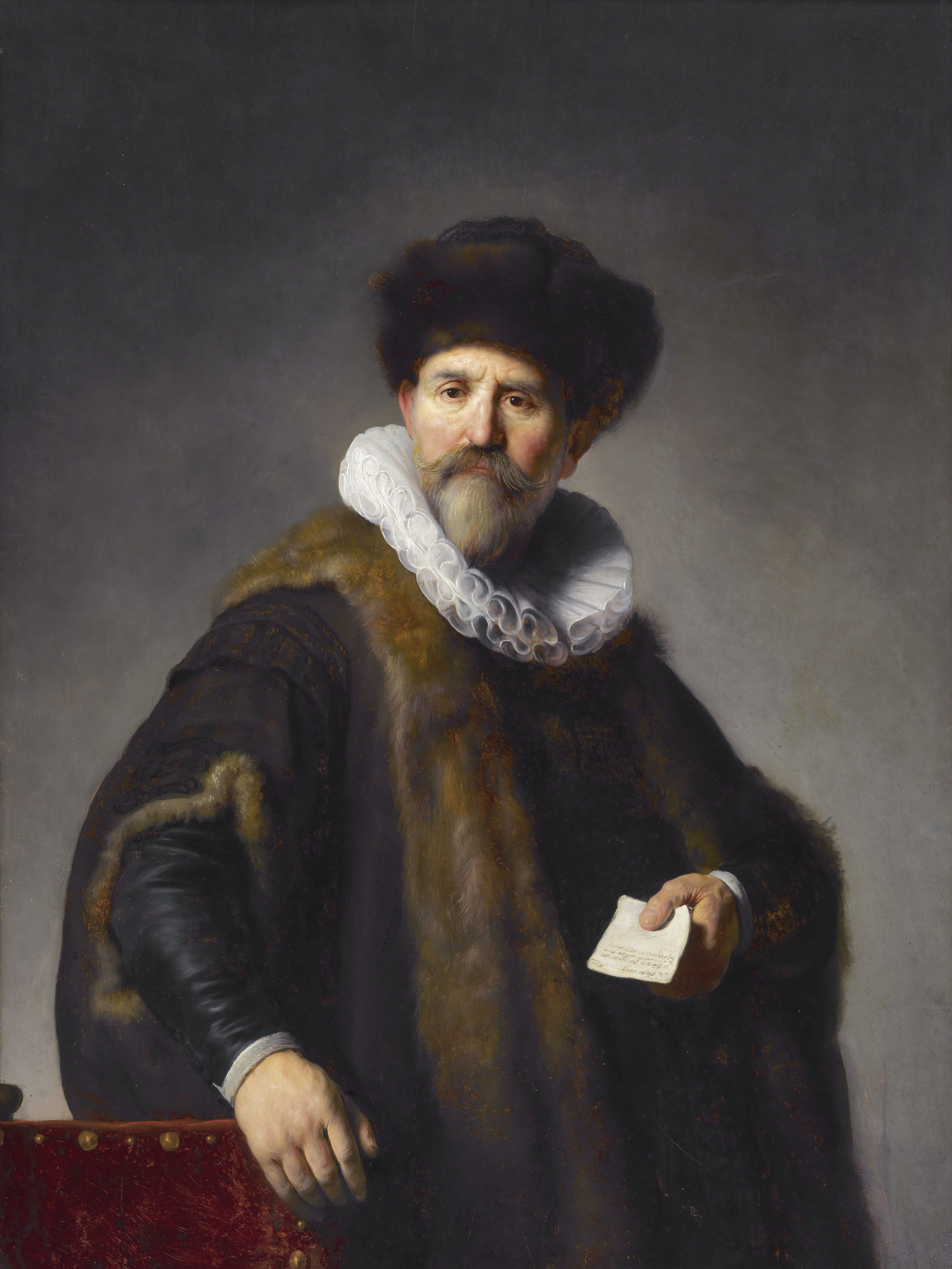
Rembrandt portrait of the fur merchant Nicolaes Ruts wearing a tabbaard, 1631

A tabbaard is an item of Dutch men's clothing originating in the fifteenth century and dominating Dutch men's fashion until 1550. It was frequently shaped like a large robe or gown with low-hanging open sleeves, often without ostentatious decoration but made of sumptuous materials such as brocades and expensive furs. It had no collar of its own, though during this period the neck ruff was in style and was frequently worn with it. After 1550 it was replaced as fashionable wear by the shorter, stiffer Spanish mantle which had a low standing collar and a drape in the back resembling a cape. By the seventeenth century it had become associated with old age, and continued to be worn by elderly men as it provided comfort and warmth.
