= Lady Louisa Greville =

English engraver

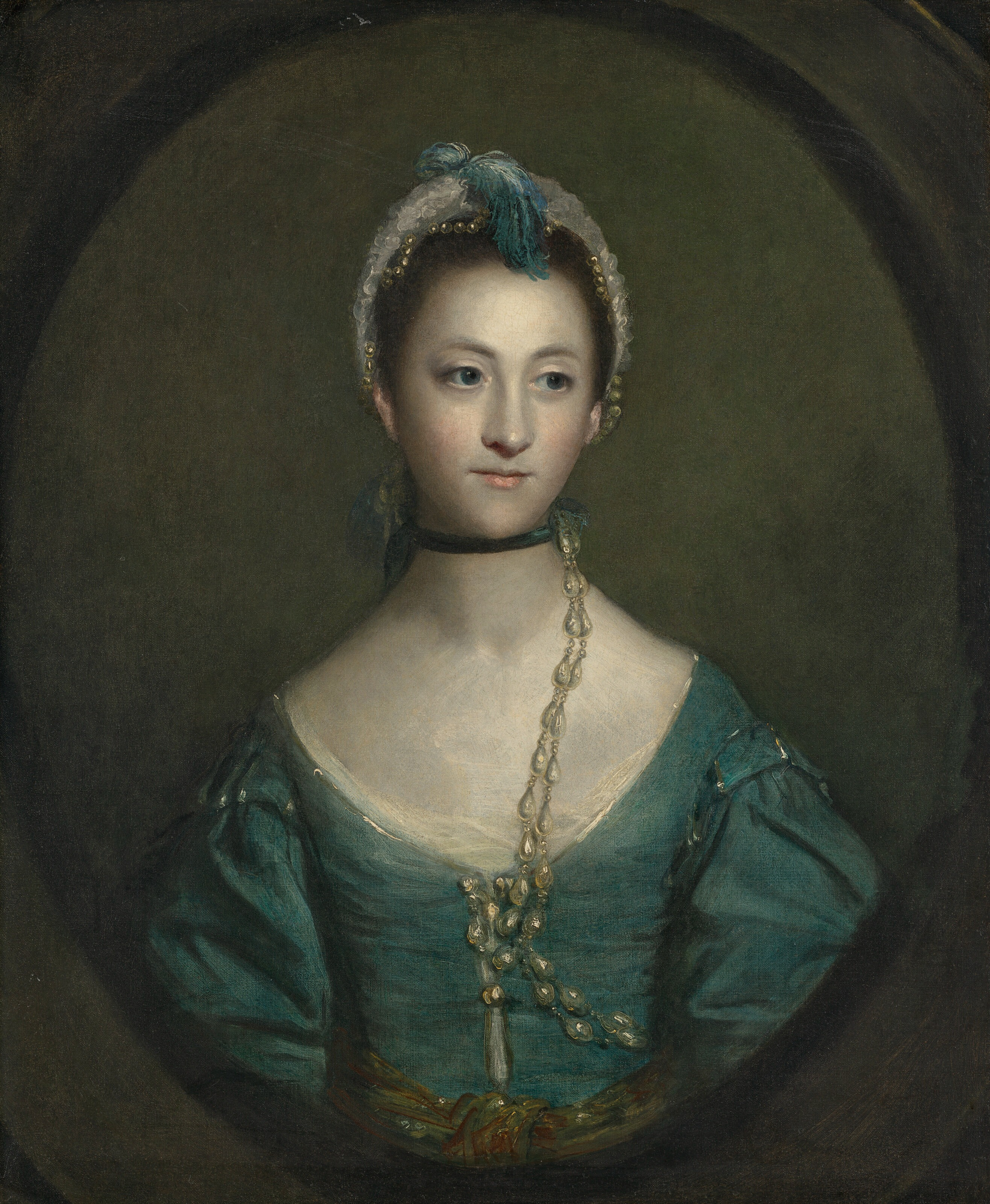
- portrait by Joshua Reynolds
- Born: 14 April 1743; Warwick Castle, Warwickshire, England
- Died: August 1779 (aged 36)
- Known for: Engraving
- Spouse: William Churchill (m. 1770)
- Parent(s): Francis Greville; Elizabeth Hamilton
- Relatives: George Greville, 2nd Earl of Warwick (brother); Charles Francis Greville (brother); Robert Fulke Greville (brother)

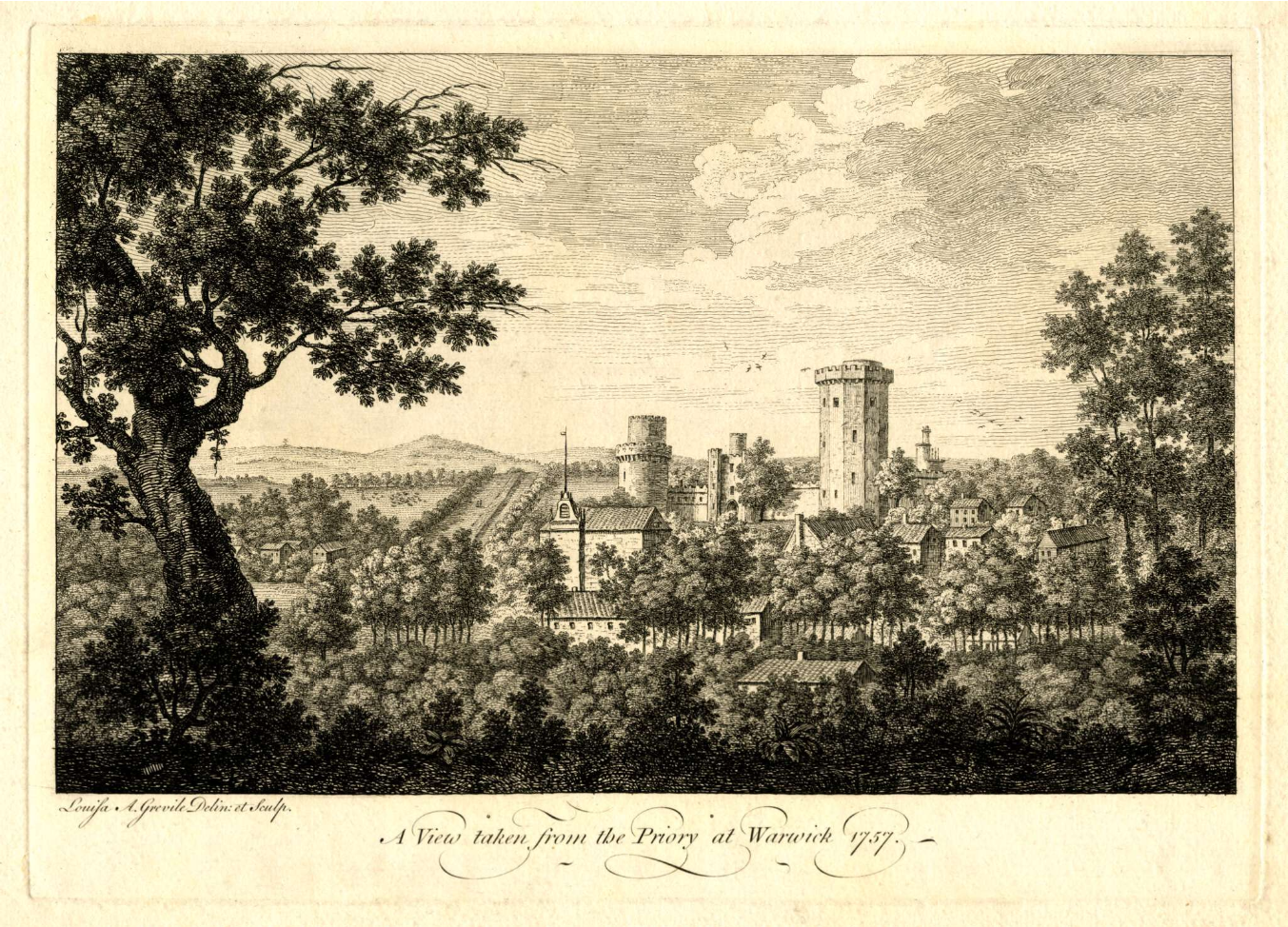
Louisa Augusta Greville - A View taken from the Priory at Warwick, Warwickshire

Lady Louisa Augusta Greville (14 April 1743 – buried 11 August 1779) was an English noblewoman and engraver. She was awarded prizes by the Royal Society of Arts.

== Family ==
Lady Louisa Greville was born in Warwick Castle, Warwickshire on 14 April 1743. She was the eldest surviving child and daughter of Francis Greville, 1st Earl of Warwick and Elizabeth Greville, Countess of Warwick. Her parents formally separated in 1765, following her mothers affair with General Robert Clerk.

Greville's brothers were George Greville, 2nd Earl of Warwick, Charles Francis Greville and Robert Fulke Greville and she also had four sisters. Her maternal grandparents were Lord Archibald Hamilton and his second wife, Lady Jane Hamilton.

In 1770, Greville married William Churchill of Henbury, Dorset. They had one son, who died in infancy in 1779. Greville herself died in August 1779.

== Artist and engraver ==
Greville was a talented etcher, a medium which was increasingly popular amongst women during the eighteenth century. Other members of Greville's family also practised in watercolours, pencil, pen and engraving, including her brothers and sisters. Most of her surviving artworks are engravings after examples by Annibale Carracci, Salvator Rosa, Marco Ricci and Guercino, among others.

Greville also produced prints of her father's home Warwick Castle, several examples of which survive in the Richard Bull Album kept at The British Museum. The Royal Society of Arts awarded her prizes for her engravings in 1758, 1759 and 1760. Her earliest dated print was made in 1757 and no dated works after her marriage in 1770 are known.

== Notable collections ==
- Landscape with a horsedrawn sedan chair, 1759, Auckland Art Gallery
