= Elizabeth Greville, Countess of Warwick =

The Right Honourable The Countess of Warwick
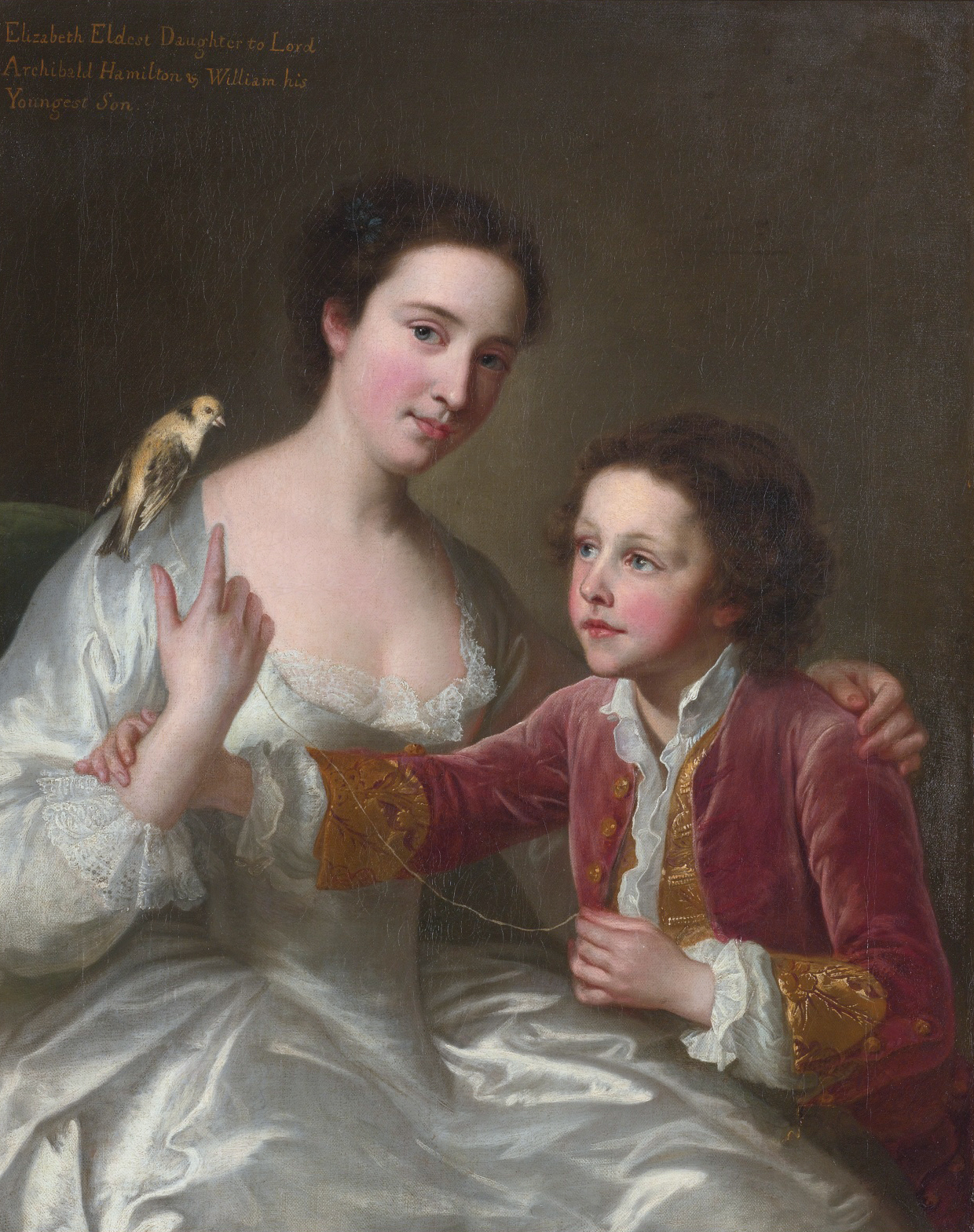
- Elizabeth Hamilton, later Countess of Warwick, with her brother Sir William Hamilton
- Born: Elizabeth Hamilton; 22 August 1720
- Died: 24 February 1800 (aged 79); Dover Street, London
- Noble family: Hamilton
- Spouses: Francis Greville, 1st Earl of Warwick; Robert Clerk
- Issue: Lady Louisa Augusta Greville; Lady Frances Elizabeth Greville; Lady Charlotte Mary Greville; George Greville, 2nd Earl of Warwick; Lady Isabella Greville; Charles Francis Greville; Robert Fulke Greville; Lady Anne Greville
- Father: Lord Archibald Hamilton
- Mother: Lady Jane Hamilton

Elizabeth Greville, Countess of Warwick (22 August 1720 – 24 February 1800), formerly Elizabeth Hamilton, was the wife of Francis Greville, 1st Earl of Warwick, who was restored to the earldom of Warwick by King George III of the United Kingdom in 1760.

She was the daughter of Lord Archibald Hamilton and his second wife, Lady Jane Hamilton, a royal mistress.

Elizabeth married the earl, then untitled, on 15 May 1742 at Park Place, Remenham, Berkshire. In 1727, he inherited the title Baron Brooke, as well as Warwick Castle. In 1746, he became Earl Brooke, at which point his wife became a countess.

The couple had eight children:

- Lady Louisa Augusta Greville (1743–c.1779), who married William Churchill and had children
- Lady Frances Elizabeth Greville (1744–1825), who married Sir Henry Harpur, 6th Baronet, and had children
- Lady Charlotte Mary Greville (c.1745–1763), who married John Stewart, 7th Earl of Galloway, and had children
- George Greville, 2nd Earl of Warwick (1746–1816)
- Lady Isabella Greville, who died young
- Hon. Charles Francis Greville (1749–1809), who died unmarried
- Hon. Robert Fulke Greville (1751–1824), who married, as her second husband, Louisa Cathcart, Countess of Mansfield, and had children
- Lady Anne Greville (1760–1783)

On 20 August 1765 Lady Dalkeith wrote, "Lady Warwick has come to England, was refused admittance at her Lord's House in Hill Street, and has taken lodgings in Kensington." Following the earl's death in 1773, Elizabeth married General Robert Clerk.

She died at her home in Dover Street, London, in her 80th year.
