= Robert Napier (British Army officer, died 1766) =

Lieutenant-General Robert Napier (died 23 November 1766) was an officer of the British Army.

== Biography ==
He was appointed ensign in the 2nd Regiment of Foot on 9 May 1722, and reached the rank of captain in the regiment on 21 January 1738. After performing regimental duty a few years, he was placed on the staff, and employed in the Quartermaster-General's Department. In 1742 he was appointed Deputy Quartermaster-General of the forces ordered to Flanders, and in 1745 he was promoted to the rank of lieutenant-colonel. In 1746, he was advanced to the rank of colonel, and he was afterwards appointed Adjutant-General to the Forces. In 1755, King George II appointed him colonel of a newly raised regiment, later 51st Foot; in 1756 he was promoted to the rank of major-general, and on 22 April 1757 he was removed to the 12th Regiment of Foot. In 1759, he was promoted to the rank of lieutenant-general. He died on 23 November 1766, at London.

Military offices
| New regiment | Colonel of the 53rd Regiment of Foot; 1755–1757 | Succeeded by Thomas Brudenell |
| Preceded by Henry Skelton | Colonel of the 12th Regiment of Foot; 1757–1766 | Succeeded by Sir Henry Clinton |
