= William Henry Elliott =

British Army general

General Sir William Henry Elliott GCB KH
- Born: 1792; Spennithorne, Yorkshire
- Died: 27 March 1874 (aged 81/82); Westminster, London
- Military career
- Allegiance: United Kingdom
- Branch: British Army
- Rank: General
- Commands: 51st Regiment of Foot; Madras Brigade
- Conflicts: Peninsular War; War of the Seventh Coalition; Second Anglo-Burmese War
- Awards: Knight Grand Cross of the Order of the Bath

Sir William Henry Elliott GCB KH (1792 – 27 March 1874) was a British Army general.

== Origins ==
Born in 1792 in Spennithorne, Yorkshire, he was the fourth son of Commander John Elliott, R.N. (1759–1834), who as a midshipman had sailed on the second voyage to the Pacific of Captain Cook, and his wife Isabella Todd (1762–1841).

== Career ==
He entered the army as an ensign in the 51st (2nd Yorkshire West Riding) Regiment of Foot on 6 December 1809. In January 1811 the 5lst joined Lord Wellington's army while encamped within the lines of Torres Vedras, and Elliott's first battle was Fuentes de Oñoro. He was present at the capture of Ciudad Rodrigo and of Badajoz, and at the battle of Salamanca, and was promoted lieutenant on 13 August 1812. During the retreat from Burgos he acted as aide-de-camp to Colonel Mitchell, commanding the first brigade of the seventh division, and was wounded in conveying despatches under fire.

In June 1813, he was appointed acting aide-de-camp to Major-General Inglis, and served with him at the Battle of the Pyrenees, when he was again wounded, and at the battles of the Nivelle and Orthez. He was then appointed brigade-major to the first brigade, seventh division, in which capacity he served until the end of the war. Elliott was next present with the 51st at the Battle of Waterloo, and he had charge of the scaling-ladders at the storm of Cambrai. He was promoted captain on 9 November 1820. From 1821 to 1834, the 51st was stationed in the Ionian Islands, and Elliott, who never left his regiment, was promoted major on 12 July 1831. On 27 June 1838 he was promoted lieutenant-colonel, and he commanded the 51st in Australia, Tasmania, New Zealand, and at Bangalore, until 1852. In that year his regiment was ordered for service in the Second Anglo-Burmese War, and Elliott was detailed to command the Madras brigade in the first campaign.

Under the superintendence of General Godwin, Elliott's brigade led the way in the fierce fighting of 10, 11, and 12 April 1852, in which Rangoon was captured, and in the storming of the Shwedagon Pagoda on 14 April. In the second campaign, which began in September 1852, Elliott again had command of a brigade, consisting of his own regiment and two battalions of Madras native infantry. After the defeat of Captain Loch by the outlaw Nga Myat Tun, Nya Myat Toon, or Myat-thoon on 4 February 1853, Elliott's men co-operated successfully in the capture of Donabyu, Myat Tun's stronghold. For these services he received a medal and clasp, was made a C.B., and made commandant at Rangoon. While there he discovered and suppressed on 20 November 1853 a plot which had for its aim the destruction of all the British in Rangoon, and thus saved the British hold on the city. In 1855 he gave up the command of the regiment with which he had been so long associated and on 20 January 1857 he was promoted major-general.

He never again went on active service, but he was made a K.C.B. in 1862 and was appointed colonel of the 51st Foot on 1 June in that year. He was promoted lieutenant-general on 27 July 1863, full general on 25 October 1871 and G.C.B. on 24 May 1873.

== Family ==
On 15 March 1831, at the church of All Souls, Langham Place in London, he married Jane Ashmore (1811–1879) but there is no record of any children. He died in their house at 20 Cambridge Square, Westminster, on 27 March 1874, being buried in Brompton Cemetery.

Military offices
Preceded by Sir Thomas Willshire, 1st Baronet	Colonel of the 51st (2nd Yorkshire West Riding) Regiment of Foot; 1862–1874	Succeeded by John Leslie Dennis
Preceded by Sir James Holmes Schoedde	Colonel of the 55th (Westmorland) Regiment of Foot; 1861–1862	Succeeded by Sir Patrick Edmonstone Craigie
