= 51st (2nd Yorkshire West Riding) Regiment of Foot =

- Active: 1755 to 1881
- Country: Kingdom of Great Britain (1755–1800); United Kingdom (1801–1881)
- Branch: British Army
- Type: Line Infantry
- Size: One battalion (two battalions 1804–1814)
- Garrison/HQ: Pontefract Barracks, West Riding of Yorkshire
- Nickname: "The Stormers"
- Motto: Cede Nullis (Yield to None)
- March: Quick: Jockey to the Fair; Slow: The Keel Row
- Engagements: Seven Years' War; French Revolutionary Wars; Kandyan Wars; Napoleonic Wars; Second Anglo-Burmese War; Indian Rebellion; Ambela Campaign; Second Anglo-Afghan War

The 51st (2nd Yorkshire West Riding) Regiment of Foot was a British Army line infantry regiment, raised in 1755. Under the Childers Reforms it amalgamated with the 105th Regiment of Foot (Madras Light Infantry) to form the King's Own Yorkshire Light Infantry in 1881.

== History ==
=== Early history ===
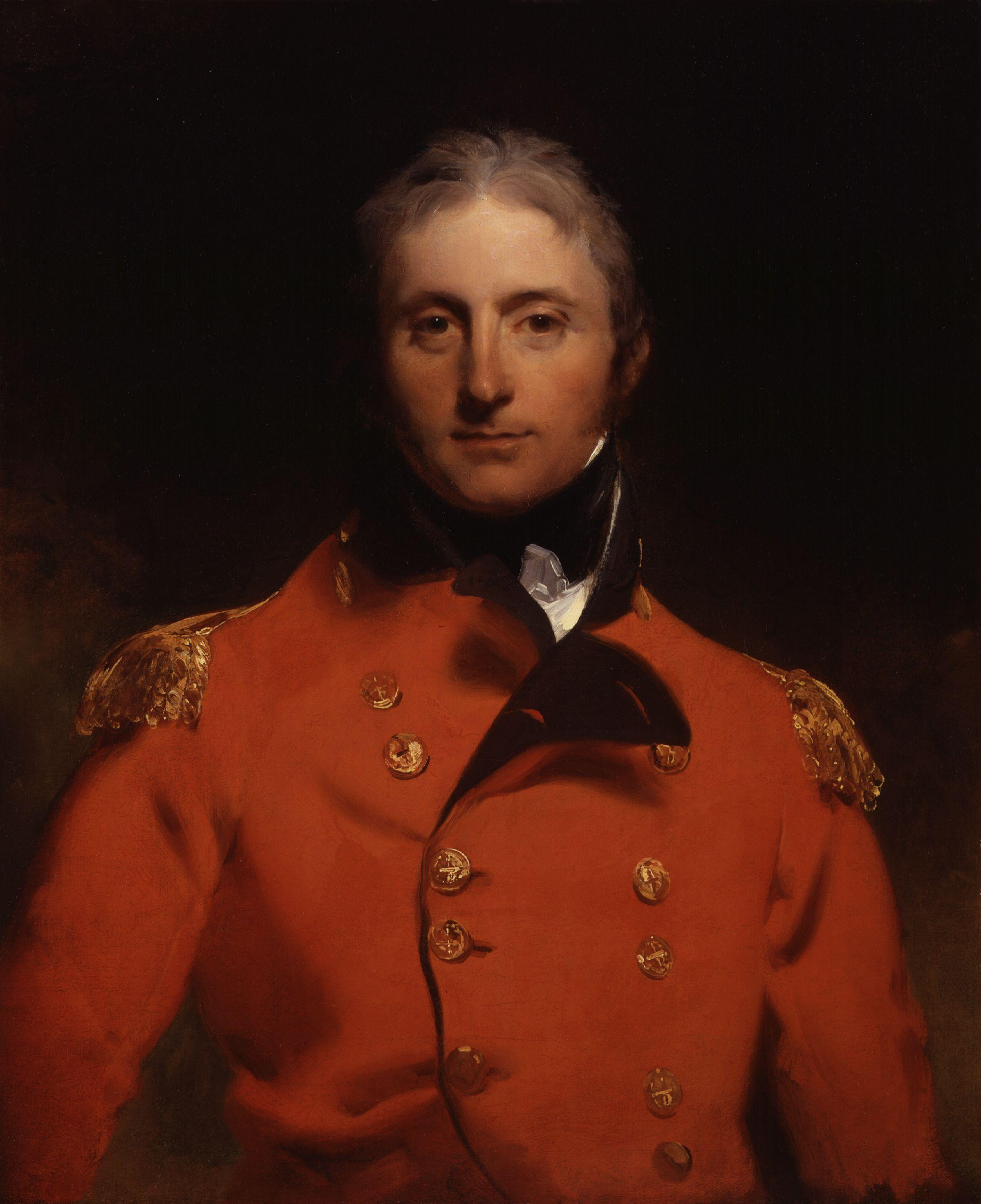
Lieutenant Colonel John Moore, who was the regiment's commanding officer at the siege of Toulon in autumn 1793 and the siege of Calvi in July 1794. Portrait of Sir John Moore by Thomas Lawrence

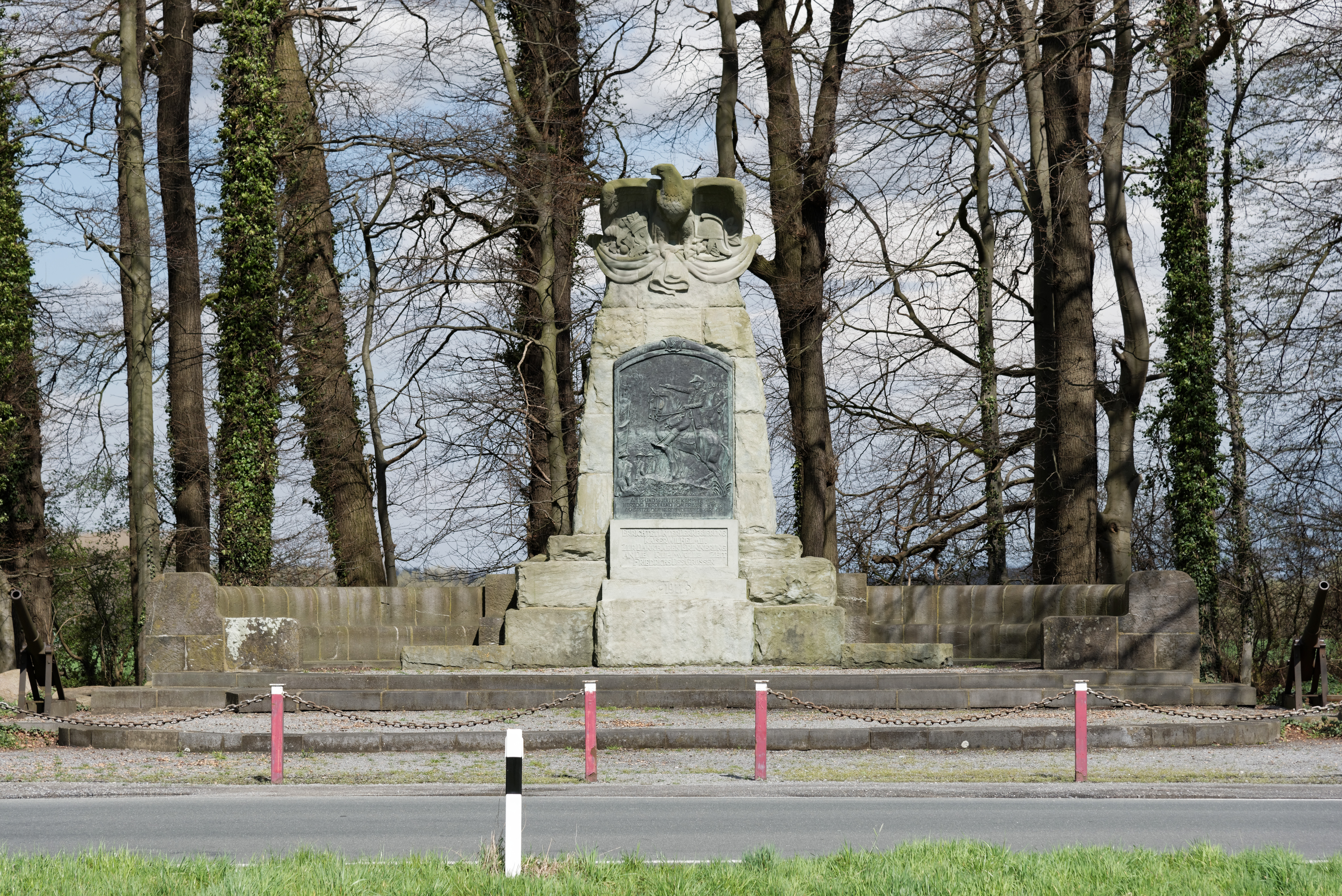
Monument to the Battle of Villinghausen in July 1761

The regiment was formed by Lieutenant General Robert Napier as the 53rd (Napier's) Regiment of Foot in 1755 for service in the Seven Years' War. The regiment started out in Exeter but was transferred to Leeds later in the same year. In the space of one month, 800 men had volunteered to serve for three years or as long as the country needed them to. It was re-ranked as the 51st (Brudenell's) Regiment of Foot, following the disbandment of the existing 50th and 51st regiments, in 1757. The regiment's first action was when it embarked on ships and took part in the Raid on Rochefort in September 1757 during the Seven Years' War.

The regiment embarked for Germany in 1758 and saw action at the Battle of Minden in August 1759, the Battle of Corbach in July 1760 and the Battle of Warburg later that month as well as the Battle of Kloster Kampen in October 1760, the Battle of Villinghausen in July 1761 and the Battle of Wilhelmsthal in June 1762. After returning home in spring 1763, the regiment was posted for garrison duty in Ireland later in the year. It embarked for Menorca in 1771 but was captured by a French invading force in January 1782 and only released five months later. It adopted a county designation and became the 51st (2nd Yorkshire West Riding) Regiment in August 1782.

The regiment embarked for Gibraltar in 1792 for service in the French Revolutionary Wars, under the command of Lieutenant Colonel John Moore, and took part in the siege of Toulon in autumn 1793 and the siege of Calvi in July 1794.

=== Napoleonic Wars ===
In early 1800 the East Indiaman Earl Cornwallis, transported the regiment to Ceylon, where it saw action in the Kandyan Wars. After returning home in 1807, it embarked for Portugal in October 1808 for service in the Peninsular War and saw action at the Battle of Corunna in January 1809 before being evacuated from the Peninsula. It became a light infantry regiment as the 51st (2nd Yorkshire West Riding) Regiment of Foot (Light Infantry) in May 1809. It then embarked for the Netherlands in summer 1809 and saw action in the disastrous Walcheren Campaign.

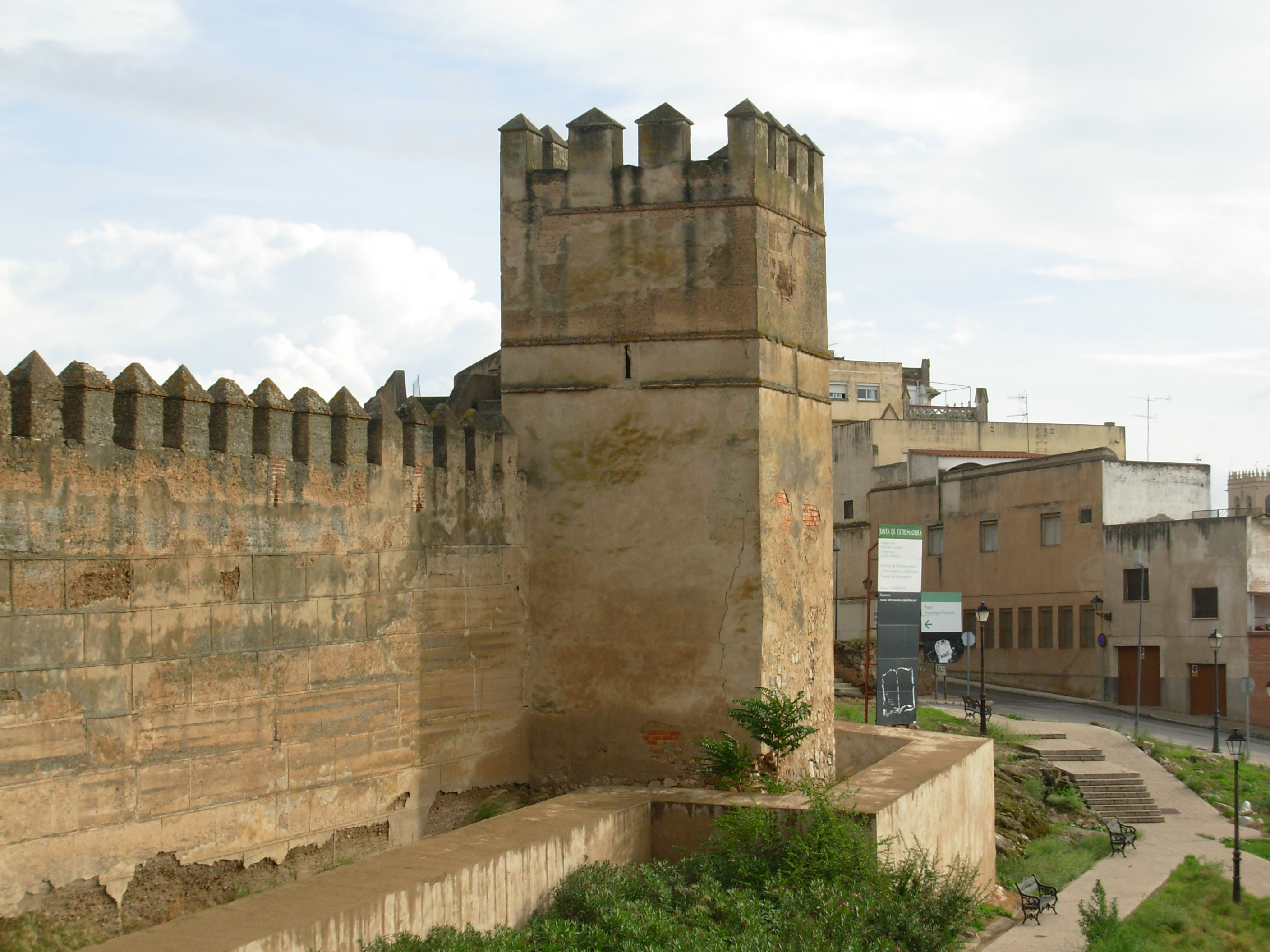
The Hangman's Tower at Badajoz, the objective of the siege by men from the regiment, in summer 1811

The regiment returned to the Portugal in 1811 and took part in the Battle of Fuentes de Oñoro in May 1811, the second siege of Badajoz in summer 1811 and the siege of Ciudad Rodrigo in January 1812. At Badajoz Ensign Joseph Dyas, a junior officer in the regiment, distinguished himself by twice leading the storming party on the San Cristobal Fort. The regiment went on to fight at the Battle of Salamanca in July 1812, the siege of Burgos in September 1812 and the Battle of Vitoria in June 1813. It then pursued the French Army into France and fought at the Battle of the Pyrenees in July 1813, the Battle of Nivelle in November 1813 and the Battle of the Nive in December 1813 as well as the Battle of Orthez in February 1814. It then returned to England in June 1814. Following Napoleon's escape from Elba in February 1815, it embarked for Ostend in March 1815 and fought at the Battle of Waterloo in June 1815. At Waterloo the regiment prevented 100 French cuirassiers from escaping the field of battle.

=== The Victorian era ===
The regiment travelled to Australia in detachments as escorts to prisoners in 1837 and then moved on to India in 1846. From there it was deployed to Burma and saw action at Pegu in 1852 during the Second Anglo-Burmese War. Although it returned to England in 1854, it was deployed to India again in 1857 to help suppress the Indian Rebellion and was still in India for the Ambela Campaign in 1863. It was also from India that it was deployed to Afghanistan in autumn 1878 and saw action at the Battle of Ali Masjid in November 1878 during the Second Anglo-Afghan War.

As part of the Cardwell Reforms of the 1870s, where single-battalion regiments were linked together to share a single depot and recruiting district in the United Kingdom, the 51st was linked with the 105th Regiment of Foot (Madras Light Infantry), and assigned to district no. 8 at Pontefract Barracks in the West Riding of Yorkshire. On 1 July 1881 the Childers Reforms came into effect and the regiment amalgamated with the 105th Regiment of Foot (Madras Light Infantry) to form the King's Own Yorkshire Light Infantry.

== Battle honours ==
Battle honours gained by the regiment were:

- Seven Years' War: Minden
- Peninsular War: Corunna, Fuentes de Oñoro, Salamanca, Vitoria, Pyrenees, Nivelle, Orthes, Peninsula,
- Napoleonic Wars: Waterloo
- Second Anglo-Burmese War: Pegu
- Second Anglo-Afghan War: Ali Masjid, Afghanistan 1878–80

== Notable members ==
- George Steward Beatson – Surgeon
- James Fullarton

== Colonels of the Regiment ==
Colonels of the regiment were:

=== 53rd Regiment of Foot – (1755) ===
- 1755–1757: Lt-Gen. Robert Napier

=== 51st Regiment of Foot – (1756) ===
- 1757–1767: Lt-Gen. Thomas Brudenell
- 1767–1795: Gen. Archibald Montgomerie, 11th Earl of Eglinton

=== 51st (2nd Yorkshire West Riding) Regiment of Foot – (1782) ===
- 1795–1800: Lt-Gen. Anthony George Martin
- 1800–1822: Gen. William Morshead

=== 51st (the 2nd Yorkshire West Riding) or The King's Own Light Infantry Regiment – (1821) ===
- 1822–1829: Gen. Sir Thomas Hislop, 1st Baronet, GCB
- 1829–1849: Lt-Gen. Sir Benjamin d'Urban, GCB, KCH
- 1849–1862: Gen. Sir Thomas Willshire, 1st Baronet, GCB
- 1862–1874: Gen. Sir William Henry Elliott, GCB, KH
- 1874–1879: Gen. John Leslie Dennis, CB
- 1879–1881: Gen. Arnold Charles Errington
