= Pontefract Barracks =

- Pontefract
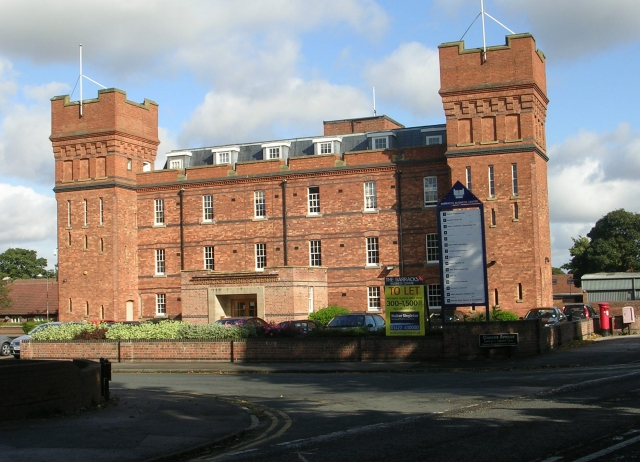
- Pontefract Barracks

Site information
- Type: Barracks
- Owner: Ministry of Defence
- Operator: British Army

Location
- Location within West Yorkshire
- Coordinates: 53.68554°N 1.32647°W

Site history
- Built: 1879
- Built for: War Office
- In use: 1879–1963

Garrison information
- Occupants: King's Own Yorkshire Light Infantry; York and Lancaster Regiment

Pontefract Barracks is a former military installation in Pontefract, West Yorkshire, England.

== History ==
The barracks were built in the Fortress Gothic Revival Style and were completed in 1879. Their creation took place as part of the Cardwell Reforms which encouraged the localisation of British military forces.

The barracks were intended as depot for the 51st (2nd Yorkshire West Riding) Regiment of Foot and the 105th Regiment of Foot (Madras Light Infantry). Under the Childers Reforms these regiments amalgamated to form the King's Own Yorkshire Light Infantry with its depot at the barracks in 1881. The King's Own Yorkshire Light Infantry remained at the barracks until 1938 when they moved to Strensall Camp.

The barracks were also intended as depot for the 65th (2nd Yorkshire, North Riding) Regiment of Foot and the 84th (York and Lancaster) Regiment of Foot. Under the Childers Reforms these regiments amalgamated to form the York and Lancaster Regiment with its depot at the barracks in 1881. The barracks were demoted to the status of out-station to the Yorkshire Brigade depot at Queen Elizabeth Barracks in 1958 and closed in 1963. The barracks were redeveloped by Asquith Properties and converted into serviced offices in 1997.
