= 105th Regiment of Foot (Madras Light Infantry) =

- Active: 1766–1799; 1824–1830; 1839–1881
- Country: East India Company (1766–1858); United Kingdom (1858–1881)
- Branch: Madras Army (1766–1862); British Army (1862–1881)
- Type: Infantry
- Size: One battalion (two battalions 1774–1799)
- Garrison/HQ: Pontefract Barracks, West Riding of Yorkshire
- Engagements: Second Anglo-Burmese War; Indian Rebellion

The 105th Regiment of Foot (Madras Light Infantry) was an infantry regiment of the British Army, raised by the Honourable East India Company in 1766. Under the Childers Reforms it amalgamated with the 51st (2nd Yorkshire West Riding) Regiment of Foot to form the King's Own Yorkshire Light Infantry.

== History ==
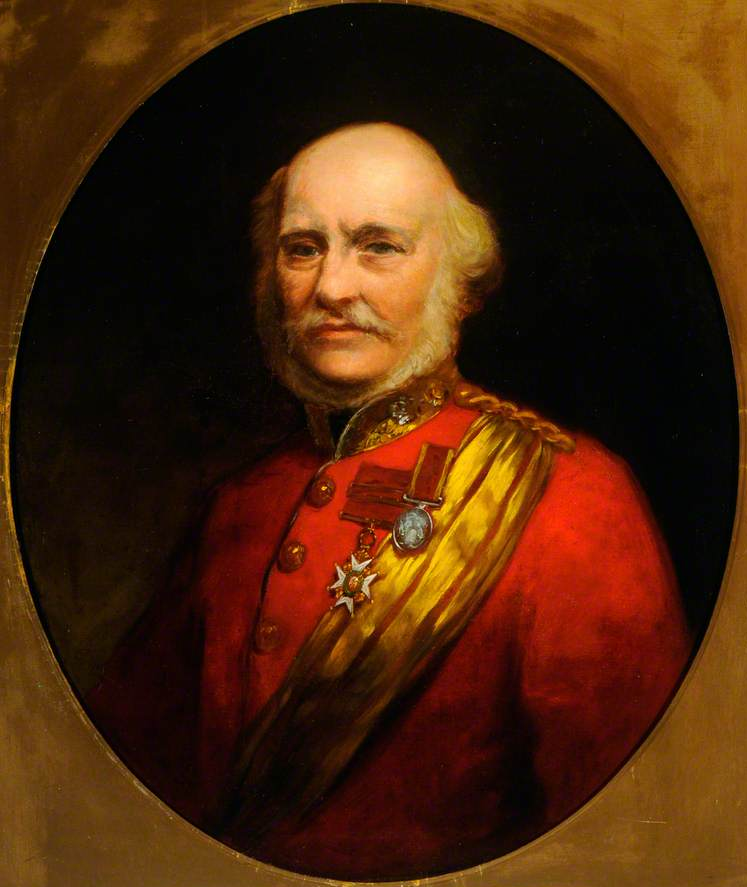
General George Alexander Malcolm, colonel of the regiment in the 1870s

=== Early history ===
The regiment as first raised by the Honourable East India Company as the 2nd Madras Europeans, when it was formed from the 1st Madras Europeans in 1766. It served in India until it was disbanded in 1799. It was re-raised as the 2nd Battalion, The Madras European Regiment in 1822 but disbanded again in 1830.

=== The Victorian era ===
The regiment was re-raised as the 2nd Madras (European) Regiment in 1839 and re-designated the 2nd Madras (European) Light Infantry in 1842. It was deployed to Burma in 1853 during the Second Anglo-Burmese War and then saw action in India in 1857 during the Indian Rebellion. After the Crown took control of the Presidency armies in the aftermath of the Indian Rebellion, the regiment became the 2nd Madras Light Infantry in November 1859. It was then renumbered as the 105th Regiment of Foot (Madras Light Infantry) on transfer to the British Army in September 1862. It embarked for England in 1874.

As part of the Cardwell Reforms of the 1870s, where single-battalion regiments were linked together to share a single depot and recruiting district in the United Kingdom, the 105th was linked with the 51st (2nd Yorkshire West Riding) Regiment of Foot, and assigned to district no. 8 at Pontefract Barracks in the West Riding of Yorkshire. On 1 July 1881 the Childers Reforms came into effect and the regiment amalgamated with the 51st (2nd Yorkshire West Riding) Regiment of Foot to form the King's Own Yorkshire Light Infantry.

== Regimental Colonels ==
Colonels of the regiment were:

2nd Madras (European) Regiment

- 1839: Col. Archibald Brown Dyce

105th Regiment of Foot (Madras Light Infantry)

- 1862–1866: Lt-Gen. Archibald Brown Dyce
- 1866–1881: Gen. George Alexander Malcolm, CB
