= HMS Lichfield (1695) =

Ship of the line of the Royal Navy

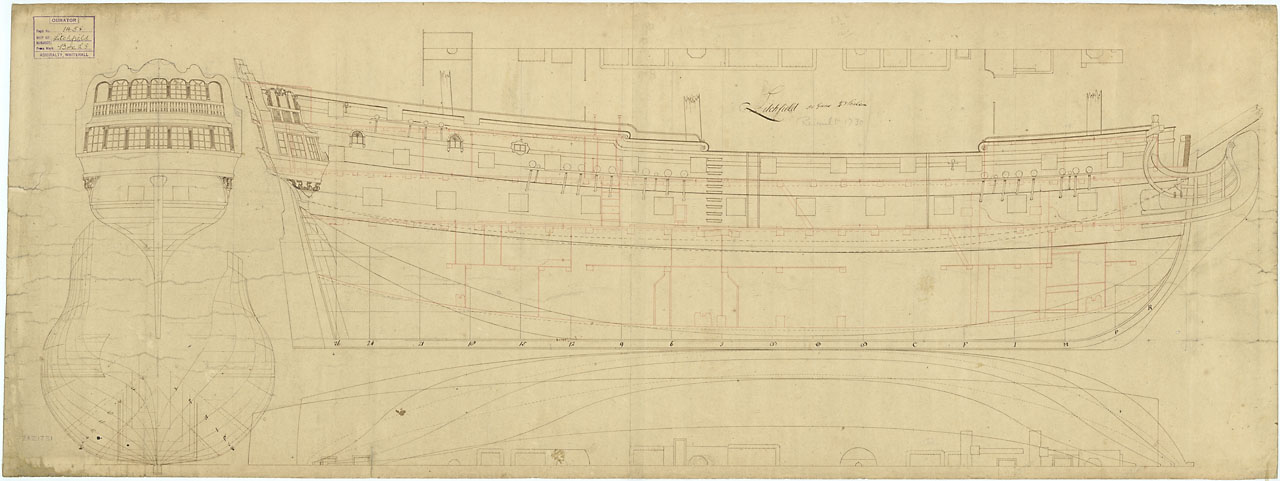
- Lichfield, plan of the 1730 rebuild

History

Great Britain
- Name: HMS Lichfield
- Ordered: 16 November 1693
- Builder: William Stignant, Portsmouth Dockyard
- Launched: 4 February 1695
- Out of service: February 1715
- Fate: Broken up, 1744

General characteristics as built
- Class & type: 50-gun fourth-rate ship of the line
- Tons burthen: 686 6/94
- Length: 130 ft 3 in (39.7 m) (gundeck) 107 ft 7 in (32.8 m) (keel)
- Beam: 34 ft 7.5 in (10.6 m)
- Depth of hold: 13 ft 6 in (4.1 m)
- Sail plan: Full-rigged ship
- Armament: 50 guns of various weights of shot

General characteristics after 1730 rebuild
- Class & type: 1719 Establishment 50-gun fourth-rate ship of the line
- Tons burthen: 755 89/94 bm
- Length: 134 ft 2 in (40.9 m) (gundeck) 109 ft 8 in (33.4 m) (keel)
- Beam: 36 ft (11.0 m)
- Depth of hold: 15 ft 2 in (4.6 m)
- Sail plan: Full-rigged ship
- Armament: 50 guns: Gundeck: 22 × 18 pdrs; Upper gundeck: 22 × 9 pdrs; Quarterdeck: 4 × 6 pdrs; Forecastle: 2 × 6 pdrs

HMS Lichfield was a 50-gun fourth-rate ship of the line of the Royal Navy, one of five such ships authorised on 16 November 1693 (three to be built in different Royal Dockyards and two to be built by commercial contract. The Lichfield was built by Master Shipwright William Stigant at Portsmouth Dockyard and launched on 4 February 1695. She was first commissioned in that year under Captain Lord Archibald Hamilton, for service in Home Waters. (Note: J. J. Colledge's Ships of the Royal Navy and Brian Lavery's The Ship of the Line list a launch year of 1694, but later research by Rif Winfield and James Goss confirmed a date of 4 February 1695.)

She was paid off in February 1715 at Plymouth, and ordered to be rebuilt on 5 December 1718, but the work did not commence until November 1727 (although the ship was taken to pieces for that purpose on 28 May 1720), and she underwent a rebuild according to the 1719 Establishment by Master Shipwright Peirson Lock at Plymouth Dockyard for a cost of £11,342-3-2d, and she was re-launched on 25 March 1730. The Lichfield continued in service until 1744, when she was first nominally reduced to a 44-gun Fifth Rate (on 1 June), but then ordered to be taken to pieces instead ten days later (with a new ship ordered to be built in her stead at Harwich), which breaking-uo was completed in July.
