= Willshire baronets =

Extinct baronetcy in the Baronetage of the United Kingdom

The Willshire Baronetcy, of the East Indies, was a title in the Baronetage of the United Kingdom. It was created on 22 May 1841 for Major-General Sir Thomas Willshire. The title became extinct on the death of the third Baronet in 1947.

== Willshire baronets, of the East Indies (1841) ==
- Sir Thomas Willshire, 1st Baronet (1789–1862)
- Sir Arthur Reginald Thomas Willshire, 2nd Baronet (1850–1919)
- Sir Gerard Arthur Maxwell Willshire, 3rd Baronet (1892–1947)
