= Thomas Willshire =

British Army general

General Sir Thomas Willshire GCB Bt
- Born: 24 August 1789; Halifax, Nova Scotia
- Died: 31 May 1862 (aged 72); Easthampstead
- Burial place: Cranbourne, Berkshire
- Military career
- Allegiance: United Kingdom
- Branch: British Army
- Service years: 1795–1862
- Rank: General
- Conflicts: French Revolutionary Wars; West Indies campaign; Napoleonic Wars; British invasions of the River Plate; Walcheren Campaign; Peninsular War; Battle of Roliça; Battle of Vimeiro; Battle of Corunna; Battle of Salamanca (WIA); Siege of Burgos; Battle of Tordesillas; Battle of San Millan-Osma; Battle of Vitoria; Siege of San Sebastián; Battle of the Bidassoa; Battle of Nivelle; Battle of the Nive; Battle of Bayonne; Fifth Xhosa War; First Anglo-Afghan War; Battle of Ghazni; Siege of Khelat

General Sir Thomas Willshire, 1st Baronet, GCB (24 August 1789 – 31 May 1862) was a British Army officer.

He was "born in Halifax, Nova Scotia, .. the eldest surviving son of Captain John Willshire by Mary, daughter of William Linden of Dublin". His father, a soldier himself, purchased Thomas' Army commission in the 38th Foot when he was only 6 years old. He joined the regiment in the West Indies in 1798, returned with it to England and probably attended schools in King's Lynn and Kensington. "He was promoted captain in 1804," joined the regiment in South America and "took part in the attack on Buenos Aires." He then went with the regiment to Portugal in 1808, where he fought at Roliça, Vimiero, and Coruña. In 1809 he served in the Walcheren Campaign, where his father died.

"In June 1812 the first battalion of the 38th embarked for the [Iberian]" Peninsula, with Willshire commanding

"the light company. It joined the Royal Regiment and the 9th Foot in the 5th (Leith's) division] three days before the Battle of Salamanca", where Willshire was twice wounded.
He commanded the light companies of the brigade in the action on the Carrion on 25 October during the retreat from Burgos. In 1813 the division formed part of Graham's corps at the Vittoria and the Siege of San Sebastian.

There "the 38th was assigned the lesser breach in the first assault" and was held in reserve in the second assault, although soon brought up "in support of the stormers".

He commanded the light companies of the brigade at the passage of the Bidasoa", the Battle of the Nive (9–11 December) and 'the repulse of the sortie from Bayonne (14 April 1814). He received a brevet lieutenant-colonelcy, and afterwards the Peninsular silver medal with seven clasps.

In 1815 his battalion was sent to the Netherlands, but was too late for the Waterloo and instead went on to Paris, [where] Willshire was employed for a short time on the staff. In December he returned with the battalion to England and in June 1818 went with it to the Cape. On his way out he wrote a manual of 'light company manœuvres in concert with battalion manœuvres' which was sent to Sir Henry Torrens and was probably used by him in preparing the drill-book of 1824. Early in 1819 Willshire was sent to the frontier as commandant of British Kaffraria. A quarrel between the chiefs, in which the British authorities intervened, led to a well-planned attack on Grahamstown by Mokana with six thousand Kaffirs on 22 April.

The attack was repulsed by a company of the

38th and 240 local troops and Mokana forced to surrender, after which the territory between the Great Fish River and the Keiskamma River was added to the colony and Fort Willshire built in it.

In 1822 the 38th [were sent] to Calcutta" and in 1823 Willshire "was given a majority without purchase in the 46th, [which he] commanded for some time at Ballary. In December 1824 he commanded a brigade in the force under Colonel Deacon which retook the fort at Kittoor. On 30 August 1827 he was made lieutenant colonel without purchase of the 2nd (Queen's), stationed at Poona, [serving with that regiment] for nearly ten years.

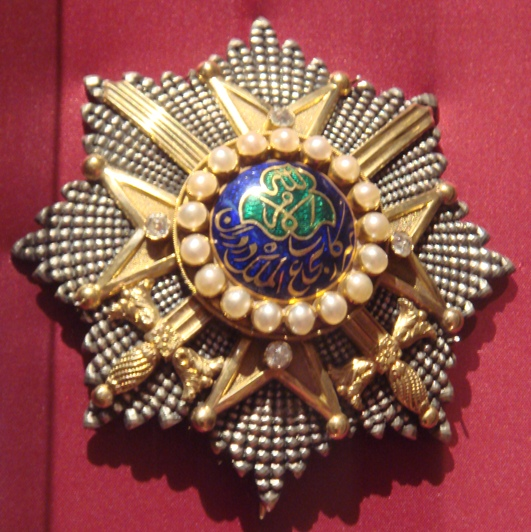
Order of the Dooranee Empire received by Thomas Willshire

On 10 January 1837, he was made brevet colonel, with the local rank of brigadier general in India. In 1838, while commanding a brigade at Poona, he was given one in the 'Army of the Indus,' formed for the invasion of Afghanistan. In February 1839 the army was reorganised

and Willshire was given the

command of the Bombay division of infantry. His troops were the last to cross the Bolan", reaching "Quetta on 30 April, and Kandahar on 4 May. He took part in the storming of Ghazni on 23 July and went on to Kabul.

On the return journey, after having been presented with the Order of the Dooranee Empire, "he was told to depose Mehrab Khan of Kelat", which he achieved by storming his fort, in the process of which Mehrab Khan was killed. He was made a Knight Commander of the Order of the Bath in 1839 and created a baronet (Willshire of the East Indies) for the capture of Kelat.

He returned to England in 1840, retired from the Queen's regiment on half-pay, and was

appointed commandant at Chatham. He remained there till 1846 when he was promoted major general. ... He was made colonel of the 51st Foot on 26 June 1849, promoted lieutenant general on 20 June 1854 and general on 20 April 1861..

He was advanced to Knight Grand Cross of the Order of the Bath on 28 June 1861.

He died on 31 May 1862 at Hill House, near Windsor. He had "married Annette Lætitia, eldest daughter of Captain Berkeley Maxwell, R.A., of Tuppendene, Kent and had two sons and three daughters".

Military offices
Preceded by Benjamin D'Urban	Colonel of the 51st (2nd Yorkshire West Riding) Regiment of Foot; 1849–1862	Succeeded by William Henry Elliott
Baronetage of the United Kingdom
New creation	Baronet (of the East Indies); 1841–1862	Succeeded by Arthur Willshire
