= Raid on Rochefort =

1757 raid of the Seven Years' War

- Part of Seven Years' War
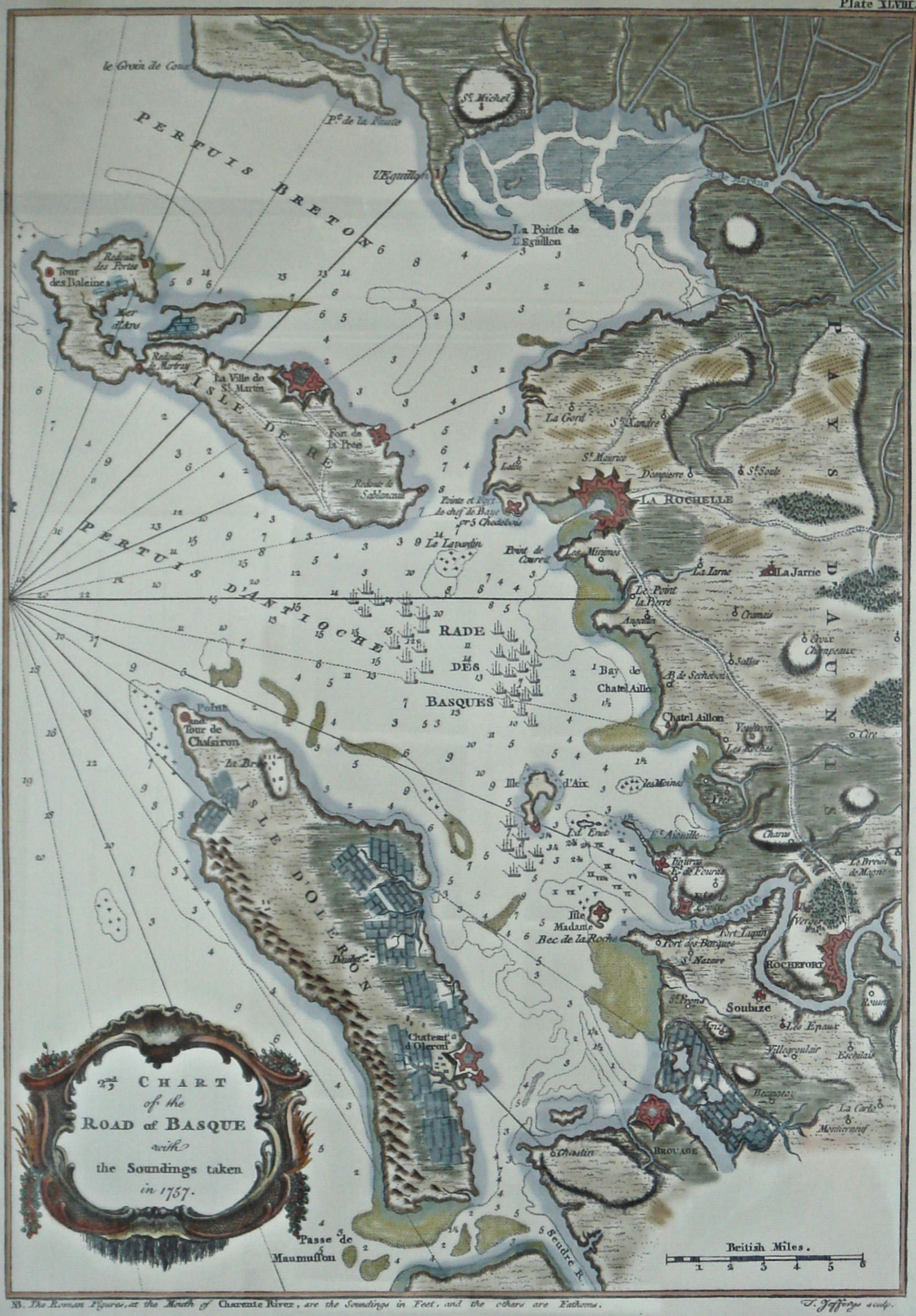
- 1757 British chart of the Basque Roads
Date	September 1757
Location	Rochefort, France 45.9421°N 0.9588°W
Result	French victory

Belligerents
France	Great Britain

Commanders and leaders
Joseph-Marie Budes de Guébriant	John Mordaunt; Edward Hawke; James Wolfe

Strength
3,000; 2 gunboats	10,000; 17 ships of the line; Several smaller ships

Casualties and losses
Unknown	Unknown

The raid on Rochefort (also known as the descent on Rochefort) was a failed British amphibious assault which attempted to capture the French port of Rochefort in September 1757 during the Seven Years' War. The raid pioneered a new tactic of "descents" on the French coast, championed by William Pitt who had taken office a few months earlier. After a number of delays the expedition reached the French coast, capturing the offshore island of Île d'Aix. With the army commander Sir John Mordaunt refusing to attempt a landing, the British force sailed for home. The raid ended in failure, but it was followed by several similar operations in the subsequent years.

== Background ==
Britain had begun the Seven Years' War badly, losing several battles to the French in North America, as well as seeing their major Mediterranean naval base of Menorca captured by a French force while Britain's ally Hanover was faced with a French invasion. In the wake of these losses, a new government including William Pitt came to office in July 1757.

Pitt wanted a bold stroke that would force the French to detach large numbers of troops, planned to be used in their invasion of Germany, to protect the French coast against further raids. He also hoped to satisfy the public who clamoured for such a campaign. An urgent demand for such an expedition came from Britain's only major ally Frederick the Great who saw it as vital to relieve pressure from an anticipated French offensive against Prussia. Frederick had suggested attacks on the French coast in the hope that it would provide immediate relief to both his own armies and the Hanoverian Army of Observation under the Duke of Cumberland.

The target which was selected was the port of Rochefort which had been highlighted by a British engineer Captain Robert Clerk as being particularly ill-fortified and vulnerable to a surprise British attack. Pitt sought approval of the expedition from George II and the Duke of Newcastle both of whom gave their assent to the concept of a large raid on the town, although both had doubts about the practicality of the scheme. As the situation in Hanover deteriorated both later pleaded for the expedition to be diverted to the German port of Stade where they could support retreating Hanoverian forces, but Pitt refused to switch the destination of the force.

=== Order of battle ===
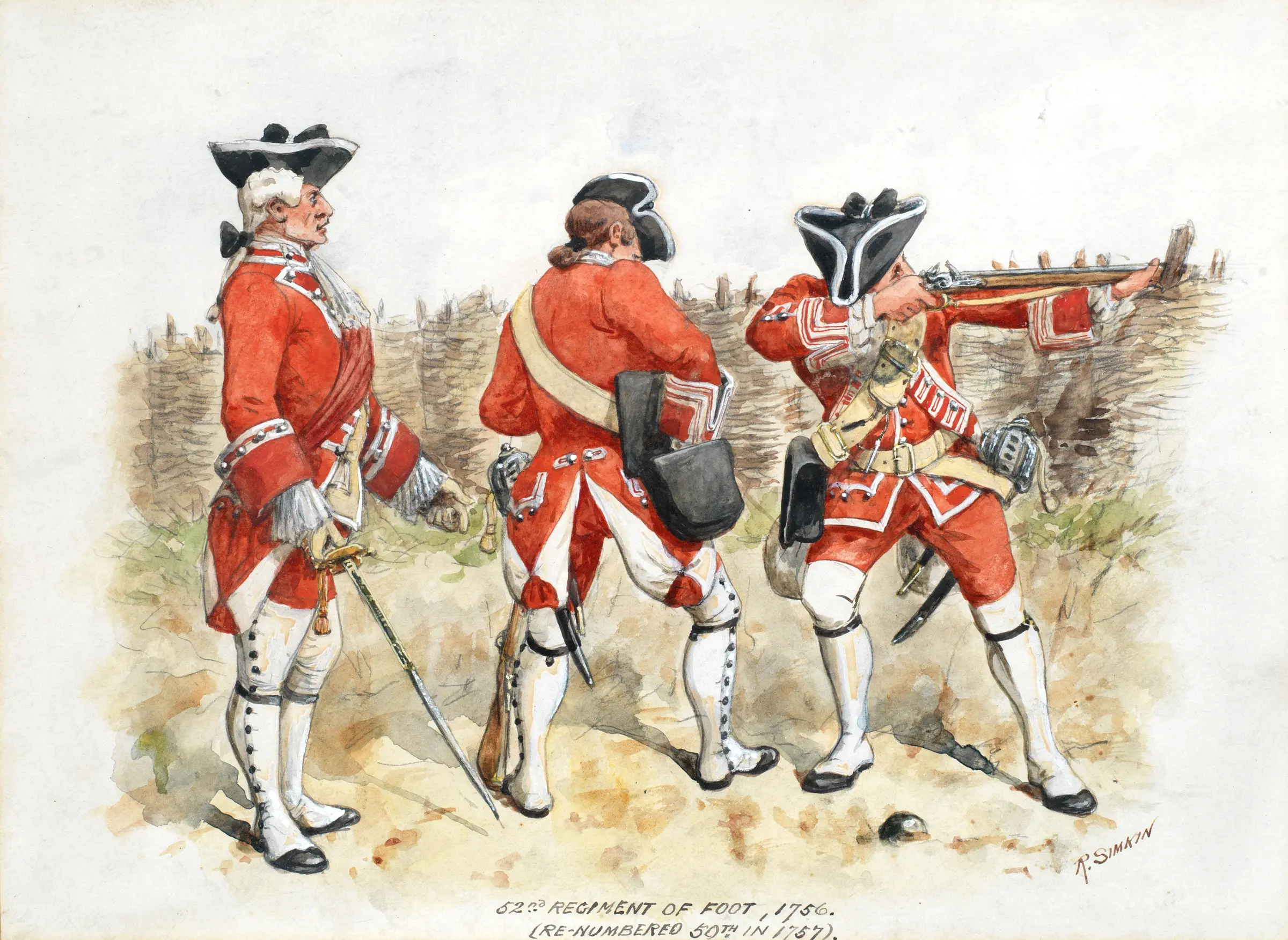
Troops of the 50th Foot in 1756, the year before it participated in the raid

The British troops involved in the battle were:

- 1st & 2nd Battalions of the 3rd Regiment of Foot (the Buffs)
- 1st and 2nd Battalions of the 8th (The King's) Regiment of Foot
- 1st Battalion of the 20th Regiment of Foot
- 2nd Battalion of the 24th Regiment of Foot
- 5th Regiment of Foot
- 15th Regiment of Foot
- 25th (Edinburgh) Regiment of Foot
- 30th Regiment of Foot
- 50th Regiment of Foot
- 51st Regiment of Foot

=== Assembly and voyage ===
Command of the land forces was awarded to Sir John Mordaunt, with Edward Cornwallis and Henry Conway as his deputies. Edward Hawke was selected to command the naval contingent whose role was to escort Mordaunt's force, land it on the French shore, and then evacuate it when the mission was over. James Wolfe was appointed as the expedition's quartermaster general and chief of staff.

The expedition was assembled on the Isle of Wight during July and August 1757. There were soon a number of delays, which pushed back the departure date. Most of the officers spent their time in Newport. 8,000 troops were eventually camped there, although all but the most senior officers were not told of the expedition's destination to prevent French spies from discovering this.

On 7 September, a month after they had been scheduled to depart, the force sailed from Britain heading for the Bay of Biscay. It arrived off Rochefort on 20 September, but due to heavy fog was unable to land for several days. Hawke and the naval officers were already extremely concerned about the worsening weather, fearing equinoctial gales that would make the sea more and more dangerous as the autumn wore on.

== Raid ==
=== Landing ===
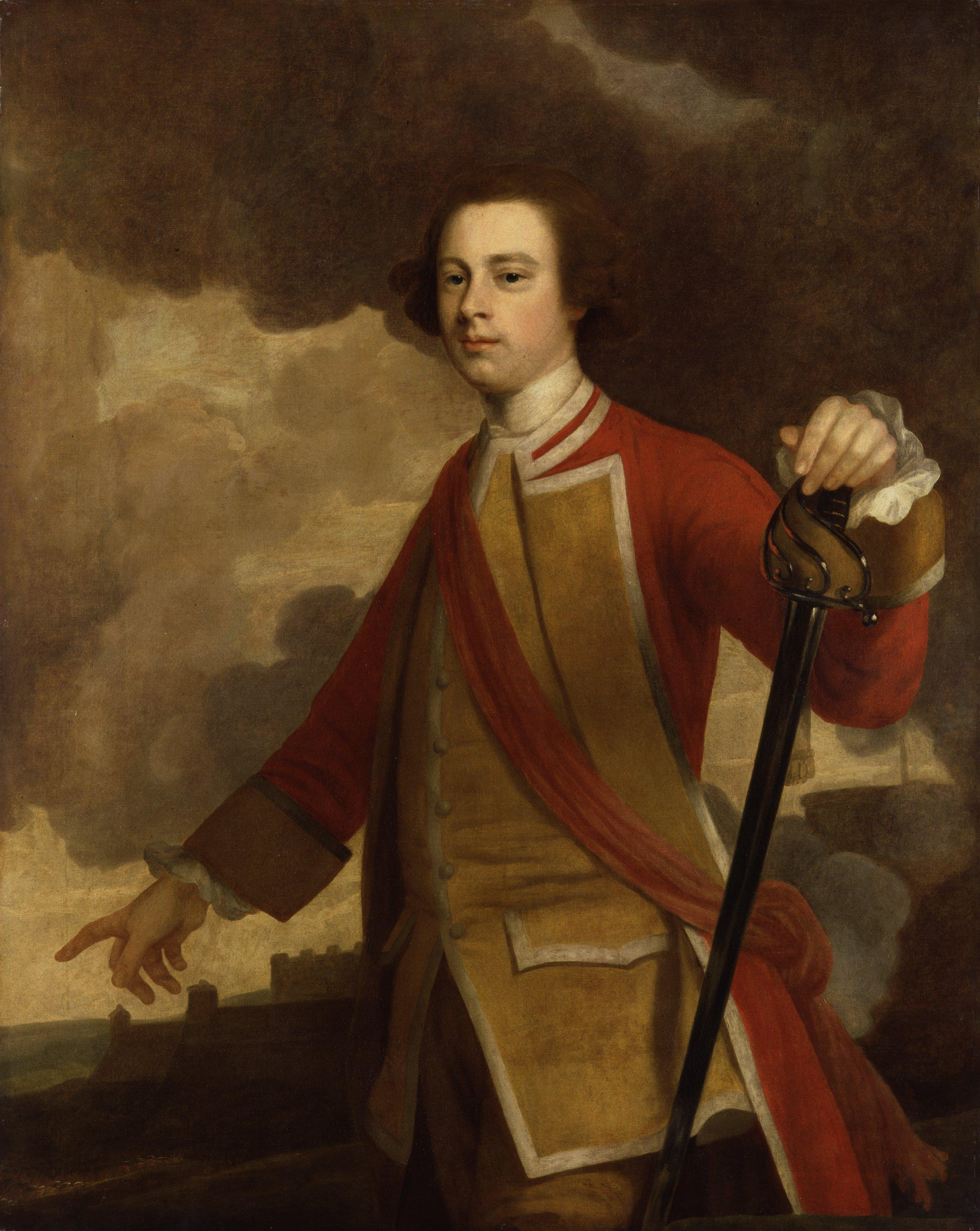
James Wolfe, the expedition's quartermaster general and chief of staff

Guided by Joseph Thierry, a Huguenot river pilot, two British warships approached the fort that dominated Île d'Aix. The guns of the fort were bombarded into silence by the guns of HMS Magnanime of 74 guns, commanded by Captain Richard Howe, soon joined by HMS Barfleur of 80 guns, and within two hours the island, considered a crucial starting point in any further assault on Rochefort, had fallen to the British.

Wolfe observed the mainland from Ile d'Aix and he noted a battery of guns at Fort Fouras on the mainland, which guarded the mouth of the river Charente. The French were totally unprepared to resist an assault, and had been taken completely by surprise by the appearance of the British fleet. Wolfe advocated an immediate assault on Fort Fouras, and also a diversionary raid in the direction of nearby La Rochelle to confuse the French about the true intentions. Mordaunt agreed to an attack on Fort Fouras, but then had to cancel it when it was discovered that the water around it was too shallow for Hawke's ships to get close enough to bombard the fort.

On 25 September Mordaunt held a council of war, where the optimistic estimates of the weakness of French defences at Rochefort were rejected, this decision being largely based on the uncertainty regarding the state of the ditch around Rochefort, which if wet would have prevented assault by escalade. It was decided that an attempt to capture Rochefort was "neither advisable nor practicable". Wolfe continued to press for a fresh assault, even though the element of surprise had now been lost, but Mordaunt was hesitant. It was still hoped that the French could in some way be harassed by the British forces and General Conway pushed Mordaunt to consider a fresh assault on Fouras, which was finally agreed at a second council of war in the morning of 28 September. A landing site near Chatelaillon was selected despite the fears of Mordaunt that large French forces might be lurking behind the sand dunes. The troops embarked in the landing boats late that night; however, a strong wind arose and in conjunction with the tide this raised concerns about the length of time before reinforcements could be sent to support the first wave of troops. The landing was cancelled.

=== Withdrawal ===
Hawke had grown impatient with the General's indecision and he issued an ultimatum to Mordaunt. If the army wasn't prepared to stage a landing, then he was going to withdraw to Britain. Faced with this ultimatum, Mordaunt decided that a further immediate assault was impossible, and agreed that the force should withdraw. Before withdrawing the fortifications of Ile d'Aix were demolished.

On 1 October the force departed Rochefort, evacuating the Île d'Aix and arrived back in England on 6 October. Mordaunt justified his decision by saying that the navy was needed to cover an incoming French fleet from the West Indies rather than sitting indefinitely off Rochefort. Mordaunt's conduct was swiftly criticised by many officers who had taken part in the operation and had believed a landing had still been possible even at that late stage with the advantage of surprise lost. Wolfe and Howe were widely acclaimed for their efforts, but the disaster at Rochefort was compared to the failure of Admiral Byng to prevent the loss of Menorca the previous year, for which he had been shot.

== Aftermath ==
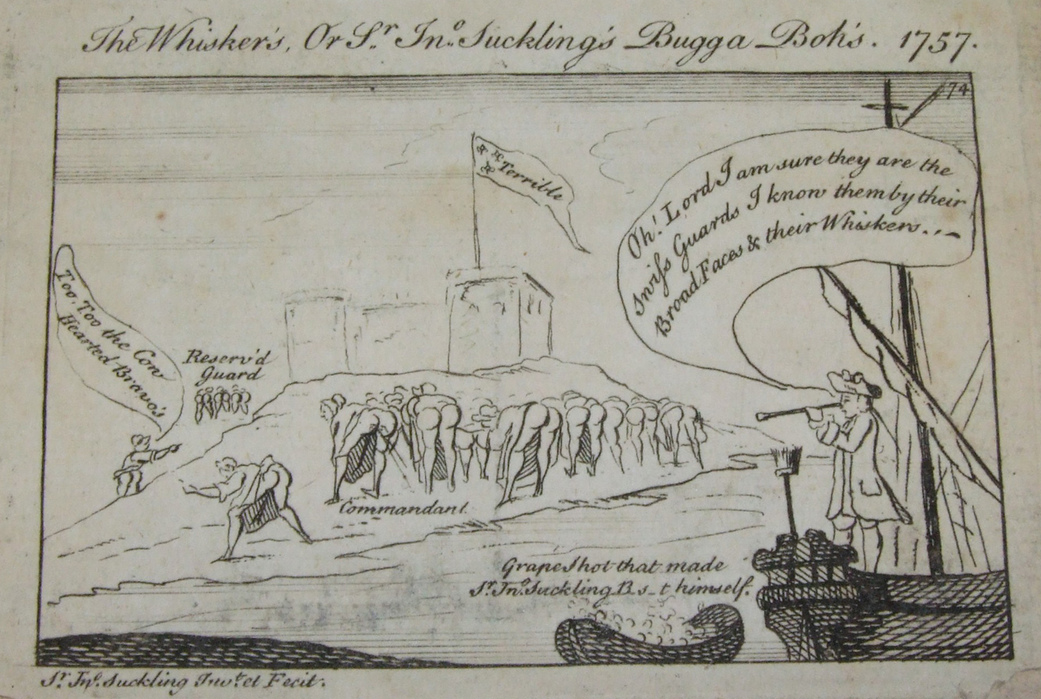
1757 British cartoon mocking Mordaunt's role in the failed raid

The failure of the expedition led to an inquiry which recommended the court-martial of Mordaunt, which commenced on 14 December. Despite intense public pressure for a guilty verdict, Mordaunt was acquitted by the court as it was ruled that the mission had been badly-conceived. The exoneration infuriated George II, who believed that Mordaunt should have been dismissed, while Pitt was left annoyed by the verdict that implied that he was largely responsible for the failure of the operation and which criticised the concept of Descents. The expedition had cost roughly a million pounds and it was likened by Henry Fox to "breaking windows with guineas".

Nonetheless, Pitt remained committed to the idea of raids on the French coast. The following year Britain launched the second of its descents with an aborted assault on Saint-Malo and the brief occupation of Cherbourg. One result of the raid, although unintended by the British, was to make the route into Rochefort unsafe for French trade convoys from the West Indies forcing them instead to make for Brest, where they were easier to capture for patrolling British warships. The bay was later the site of the Battle of the Basque Roads in 1809.

== See also ==
- Great Britain in the Seven Years War

== Bibliography ==
- Anderson, Fred. Crucible of War: The Seven Years War and the Fate of Empire in British North America, 1754-1766. Faber and Faber, 2000.
- Black, Jeremy. British Lives: William Pitt. Cambridge University Press, 1992.
- Brumwell, Stephen. Paths of Glory: James Wolfe. Hambledon, 2006.
- Corbett, Julian Stafford. England in the Seven Years' War: A study in Combined Operations. Volume I. London, 1907.
- Middleton, Richard. The Bells of Victory: The Pitt-Newcastle Ministry and the Conduct of the Seven Years' War, 1757-1762. Cambridge University Press, 1985.
- Robson, Martin (2016). A History of the Royal Navy: The Seven Years War. London: IB Taurus. ISBN 9781780765457.
- Rodger N.A.M. Command of the Ocean: A Naval History of Britain, 1649-1815. Penguin Books, 2006.
- Simms, Brendan. Three Victories and a Defeat: The Rise and Fall of the First British Empire. Penguin Books (2008)
- Syrett, David. Admiral Lord Howe: A Biography. Spellmount, 2006.
