= Francis Greville, 1st Earl of Warwick =

British peer and landowner

The Right Honourable The Earl of Warwick KT
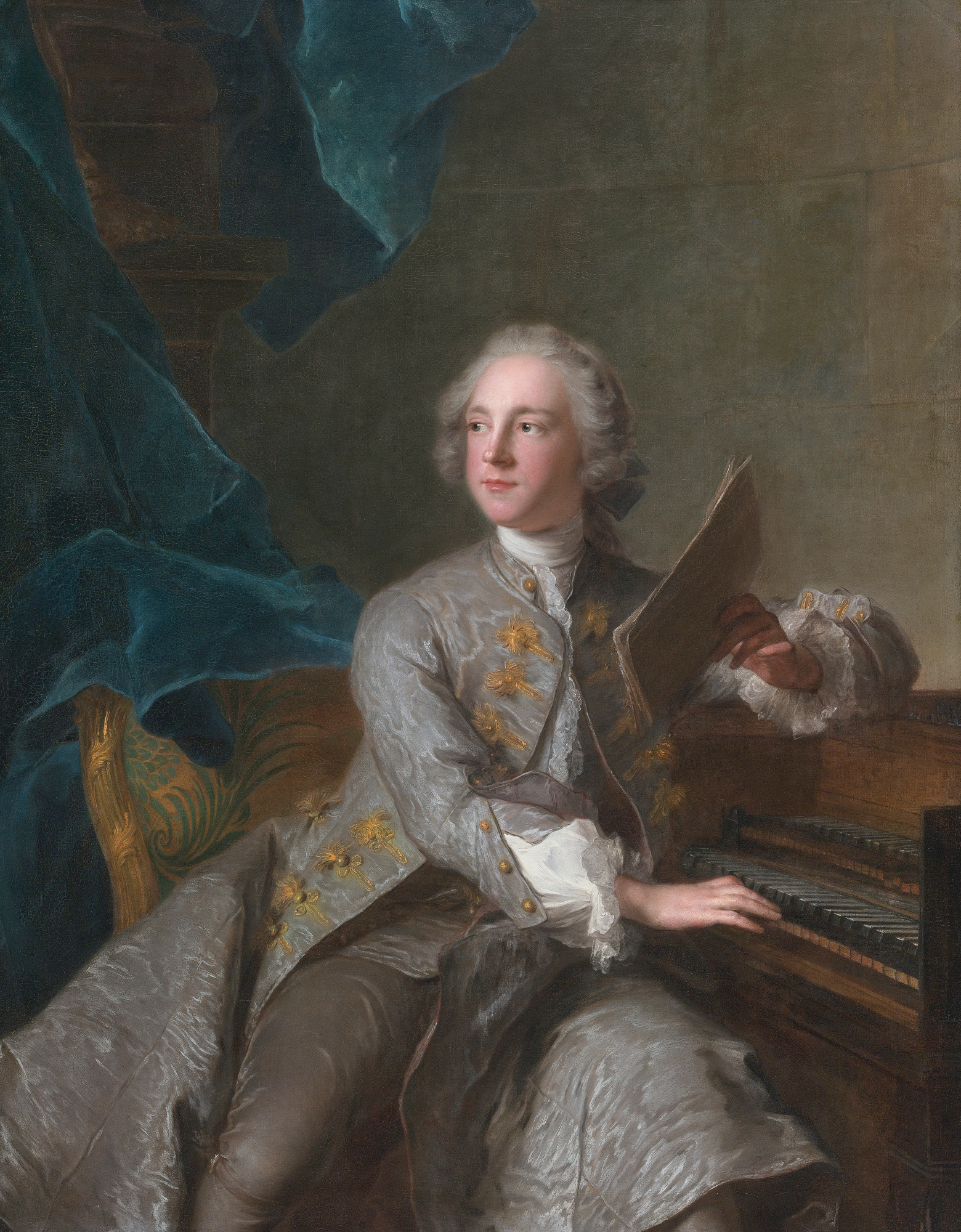
- Portrait by Jean-Marc Nattier, 1741
- Born: 10 October 1719
- Died: 8 July 1773 (aged 53)
- Spouse: Elizabeth Hamilton (m. 1742; div. 1765)
- Children: Louisa, George, Charles, Robert, and 4 other daughters

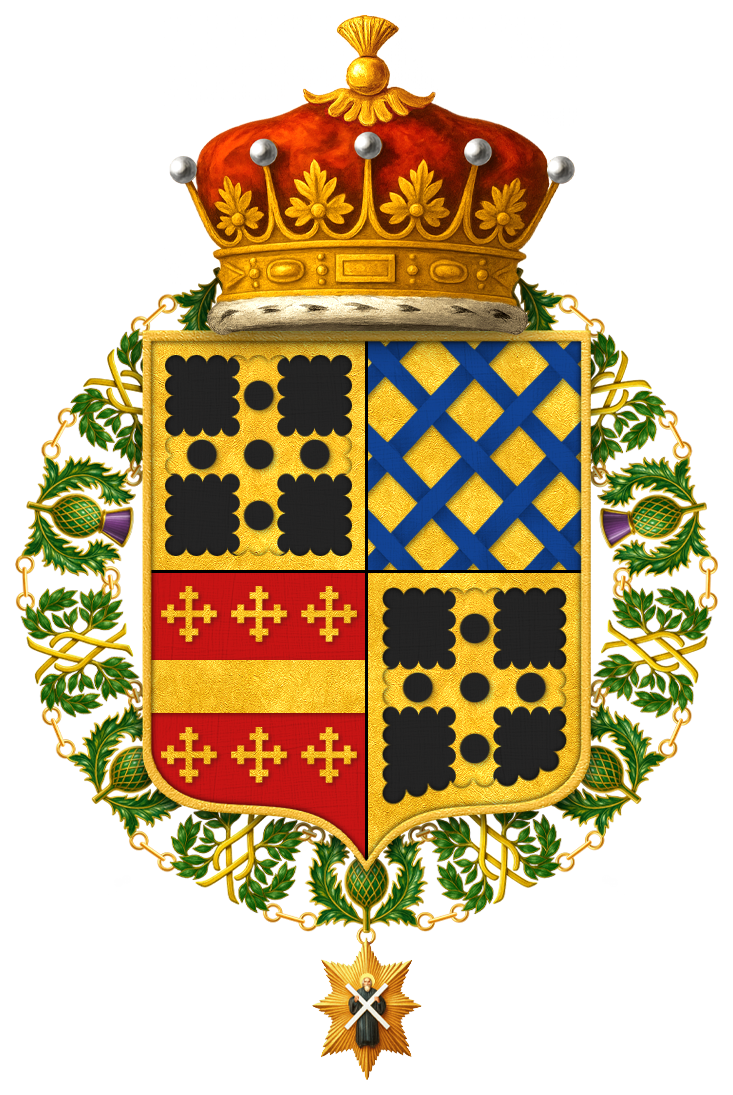
Shield of arms of Francis Greville, 1st Earl of Warwick, 1st Earl Brooke, KT, encircled with the collar of the Order of the Thistle

Francis Greville, 1st Earl of Warwick, KT (10 October 1719 – 8 July 1773), styled as Lord Brooke from 1727 to 1746 and Earl Brooke from 1746, was a British peer and landowner. He inherited Warwick Castle and the title of Baron Brooke from his father in 1727. His education included time as a gentleman commoner at Winchester College (around 1731). He was created Earl Brooke of Warwick Castle on July 7, 1746 and became Lord Lieutenant of Warwickshire in 1749. He became a Knight of the Thistle in 1743. In 1759, he petitioned George II for the title Earl of Warwick when the last Earl of Warwick from the Rich family died. Francis' petition was granted, and Warwick Castle was once again held by the Earls of Warwick.

== Patronage ==
He was responsible for various renovations to the castle, including the construction of the State Dining Room and the private apartments. His early dalliances with the Neo-Gothic style even caught the attention of the infamous Horace Walpole, who referred to him once as "little Brooke". Lancelot "Capability" Brown was hired by the Earl to redesign the gardens and grounds surrounding the castle. Warwick possibly lent money against and then took a mortgage over a slave plantation in Tobago in c. 1771. However, University College London's Centre for the Study of the Legacies of British Slavery notes that the exact truth of this claim is unclear.

Francis was a significant patron of artists, his account ledgers at Hoare's bank include references to artists such as Joshua Reynolds, Thomas Gainsborough, Allan Ramsay, Angelica Kauffmann, Thomas Patch and George Stubbs. Between 1748 and 1752, Giovanni Canal was commissioned to paint five celebrated views of the castle. His son George Greville, 2nd Earl of Warwick further improved the castle and bought many of its present furnishings.

== Family ==
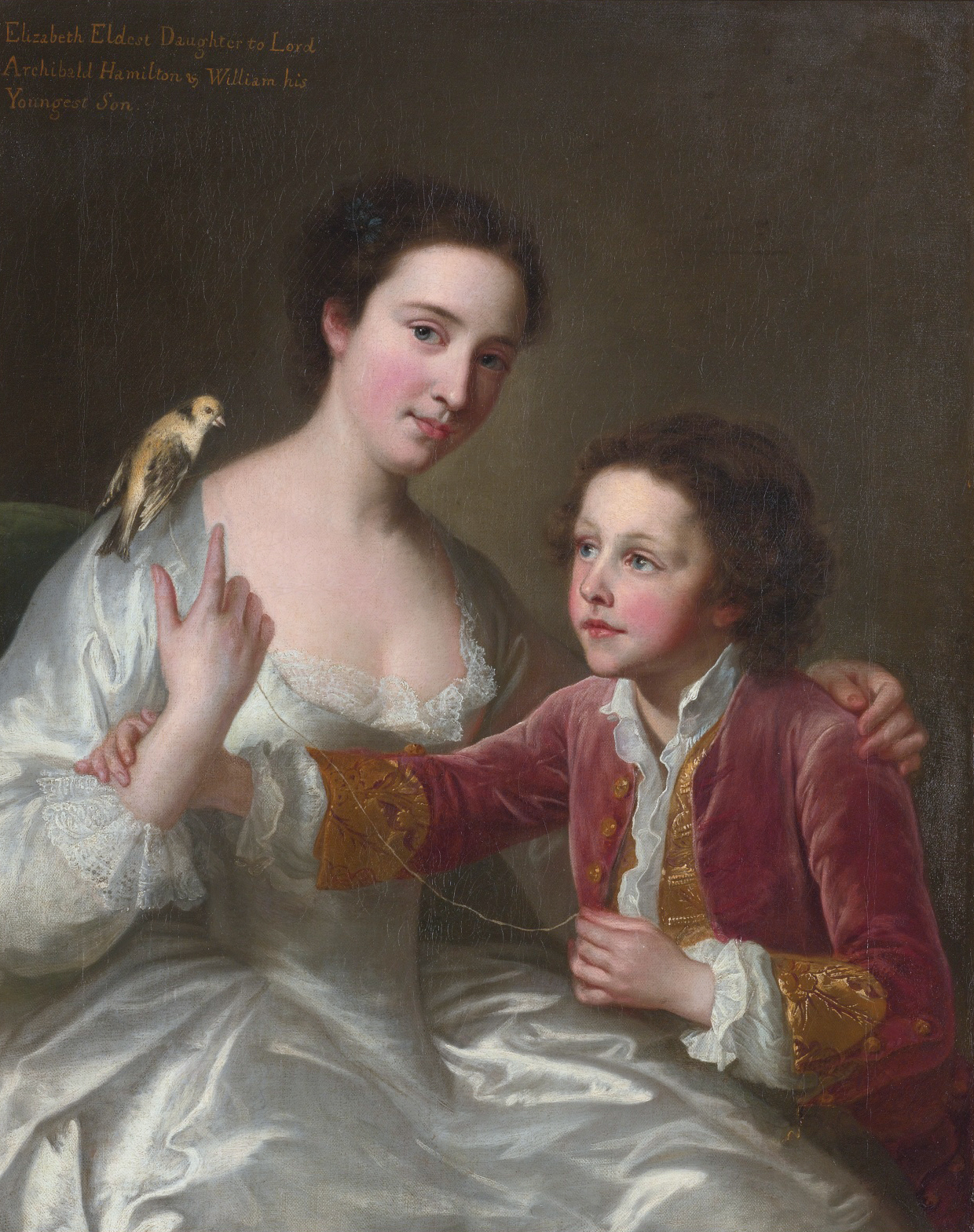
Elizabeth Hamilton, later Countess of Warwick (1720–1800), and her brother William (William Hoare)

He married Elizabeth Hamilton on 15 May 1742 at Park Place, Remenham, Berkshire, daughter of Lord Archibald Hamilton and Lady Jane Hamilton, by whom he had eight children:

- Lady Louisa Augusta Greville (1743–), married William Churchill in 1770
- Lady Frances Elizabeth Greville (11 May 1744 – 6 April 1825), married Sir Henry Harpur, 6th Baronet in 1762
- Lady Charlotte Mary Greville (c. 1745 – 31 May 1763), married John Stewart, 7th Earl of Galloway in 1762
- George Greville, 2nd Earl of Warwick (1746–1816)
- Lady Isabella Greville, died young
- Charles Francis Greville (1749–1809)
- Robert Fulke Greville (1751–1824), married Louisa Murray (née Cathcart), Countess of Mansfield in 1796
- Lady Anne Greville (1760–1783)

After a cooling of their marriage, and after Elizabeth's love affair with General Robert Clerk, the Earl and his wife entered into a formal separation in September 1765.

== See also ==
- Earl of Warwick
- List of owners of Warwick Castle

Honorary titles
Preceded by The Duke of Montagu	Lord Lieutenant of Warwickshire; 1749–1757	Succeeded by The Marquess of Hertford
Peerage of Great Britain
New creation	Earl of Warwick; 4th creation 1759–1773	Succeeded by George Greville
New creation	Earl Brooke; 1746–1773	Succeeded by George Greville
Preceded by William Greville	Baron Brooke; 1727–1773	Succeeded by George Greville
