= Jane, Lady Archibald Hamilton =

British courtier

Jane Hamilton
- Lady Archibald Hamilton
- Known for: Mistress of Frederick, Prince of Wales
- Born: before 1704
- Died: 6 December 1753; Paris
- Noble family: Hamilton
- Spouse: Lord Archibald Hamilton
- Issue: Charles; Elizabeth Greville, Countess of Warwick; Frederic; Archibald; Sir William Hamilton; Jane
- Father: James Hamilton, 6th Earl of Abercorn
- Mother: Elizabeth Reading
- Occupation: First Lady of the Bedchamber to Princess Augusta of Saxe-Gotha

Jane, Lady Archibald Hamilton (née Lady Jane Hamilton) (before 1704 – 6 December 1753, Paris) was a British noblewoman and courtier. She was mistress to Frederick, Prince of Wales and First Lady of the Bedchamber, Mistress of the Robes and Privy Purse to his wife, Augusta of Saxe-Gotha.

== Life ==
She was the fifth child and third daughter of James Hamilton, 6th Earl of Abercorn (d. 1734) and Elizabeth Reading, daughter of Sir Robert Reading, 1st Baronet.

On 29 September 1719 she married Lord Archibald Hamilton (d. 1754). They had six children:

- Charles (?–1751), married Mary Dufresne.
- Elizabeth (1720–1800), married Francis Greville, 1st Earl of Warwick (1719–1773).
- Frederic (1728–1811), religious minister. Married Rachel Daniel, on 11 June 1757.
- Archibald (accidentally drowned, 1744)
- Sir William Hamilton (1730–1803), diplomat. Married Catherine Barlow (25 January 1758; died 1783) and Emma Hart (6 September 1795; died 1815).
- Jane (1726–1771), married Charles Schaw (later Charles Cathcart, 9th Lord Cathcart), on 24 July 1753.

She was appointed to serve as First Lady of the Bedchamber to the new Princess of Wales, Princess Augusta of Saxe-Gotha upon her arrival in 1736, a position in which she was described as very strict. In parallel, she also succeeded Anne Vane as the mistress to the Prince of Wales between 1736 and 1745. She was replaced as mistress by Lady Middlesex.

Jane died in Paris in 1753 and is buried in Montmartre.

== Gallery ==
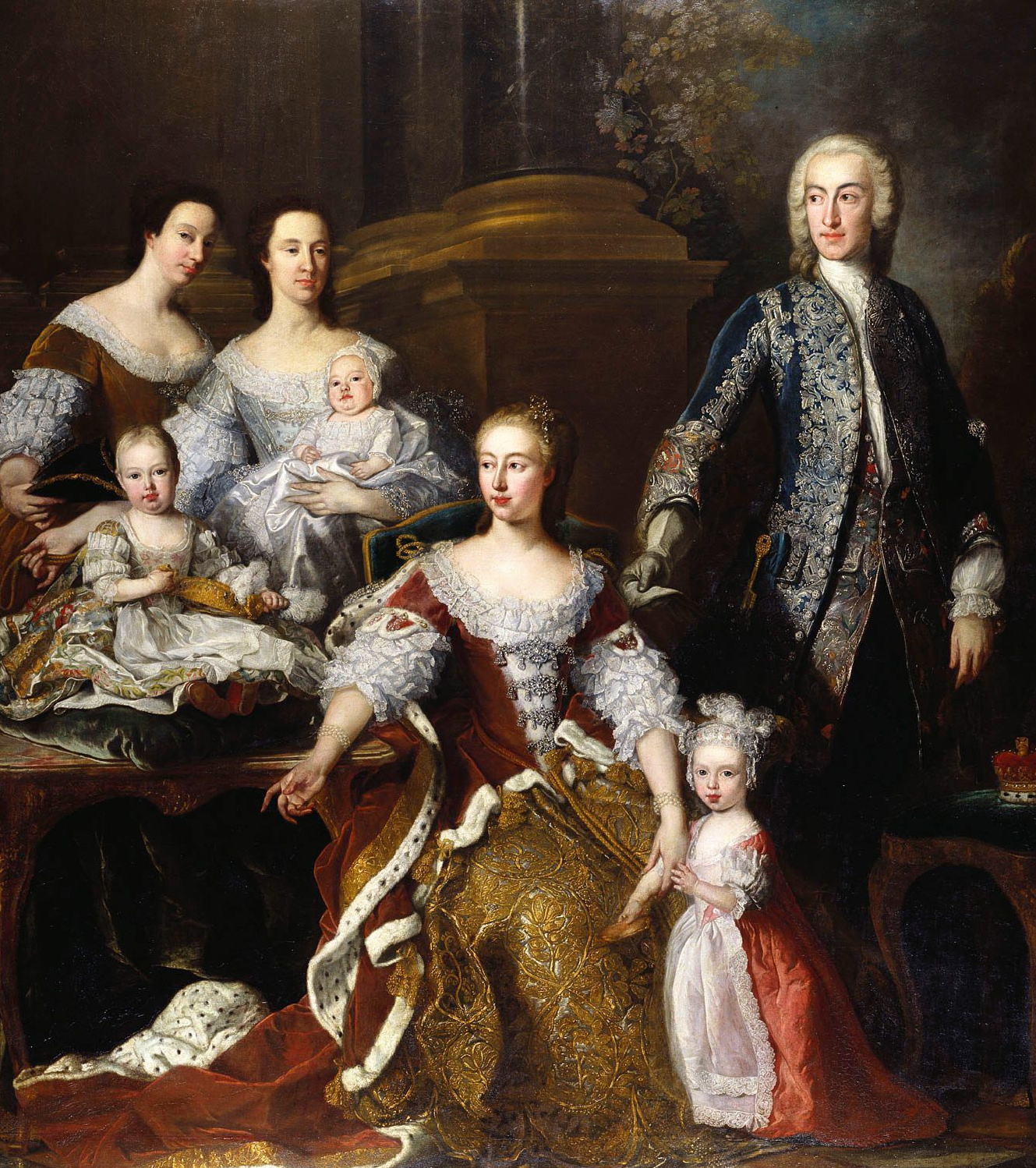
Lady Jane Hamilton portrayed with Augusta, Princess of Wales and her household.

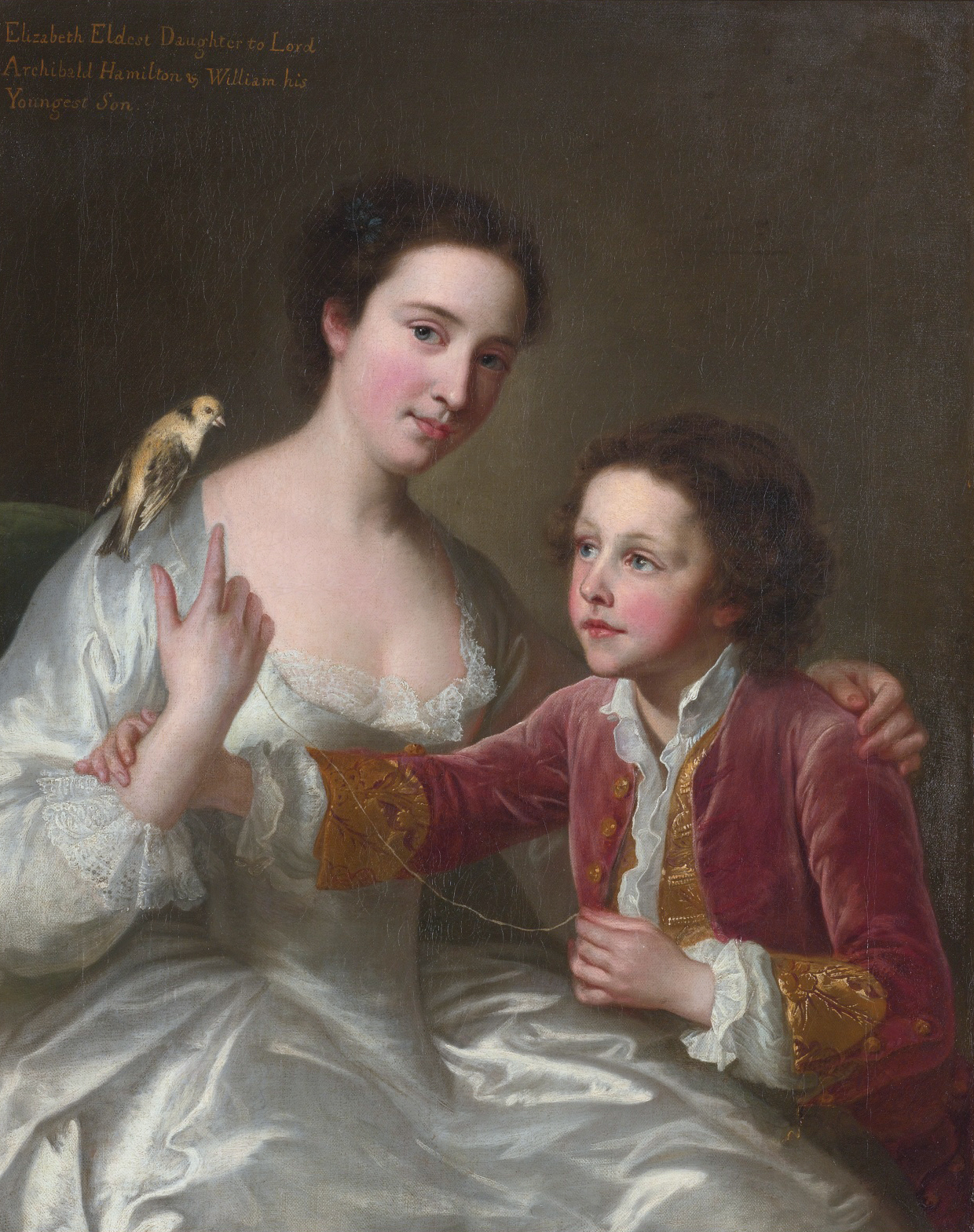
Archibald and Jane's children Elizabeth and William. (William Hoare).
