= Robert Clerk =

British soldier

General Robert Clerk (c.1720 – 1797) was a British engineer officer who served in the War of the Austrian Succession and the Seven Years' War. His report on the state of the defences of Rochefort (Rochefort, Charente-Maritime) in 1757 was the main reason for that French naval port being chosen as the target for a major British expedition, the Raid on Rochefort, for which Clerk was appointed chief engineer.

== Early career ==
Robert Clerk (sometimes spelled Clark or Clarke) was born about 1720, the son of an Edinburgh physician. John Entick speaks of him as a worthy, intelligent, skilful officer. However Horace Walpole wrote, ”There was a young Scot, by name Clarke, ill-favoured in his person, with a cast in his eyes, of intellects not very sound, but quick, bold, adventurous.” Clerk entered the Army as a second lieutenant in Cotterrell's Marines with seniority 11 June 1741. He was appointed a practitioner engineer on 24 May 1749, promoted to sub-engineer on 30 May 1753, while also becoming a lieutenant in the 25th Regiment of Foot on 2 October 1755. In 1745 Clerk went as “a Volunteer with Sir John Mordaunt to Ostend, but they did not arrive, till after the Siege; he saw the Attack, and was afterwards in the trenches.” In 1746, Clerk was appointed as an engineer-in-ordinary to an expedition, commanded by General St Clair, to take Quebec. Due to the lateness of the season, in September the force was diverted to Port L’Orient in Brittany. In 1747 Clerk was an engineer with the Anglo-Dutch troops defending the town of Bergen-op-Zoom against the besieging French army led by Count Löwendahl. After a long and destructive siege the town was taken by a surprise assault and Clerk captured; “being pursued into a house where the enemies fired at him through a door, he opened it and told them he was related to Marshal Löwendahl, who would reward them for saving him. Being conducted to the Marshal, with the same readiness he avowed the deceit, urging that he had no other method of saving his life. Löwendahl was pleased with the man, and gave him money.” Clerk was held as a prisoner of war and not released until the end of the war in 1748.

== Background to the Raid on Rochefort ==
In Clerk's own words, “In returning from Gibraltar in (April) 1754, I went along Part of the western Coast of France to see the Conditions of some of their Fortifications of their Places of Importance, on purpose to Judge if an Attempt could be made with a Probability of Success.... I had heard that Rochefort, tho’ a Place of the utmost Importance, had been very much neglected. I went there, and waited upon the Governor in my Regimentals, told him, that I was upon my Way to England from Gibraltar, and that I came on purpose to see the Place, the Dock, and the Men of War. He was very polite; I was shewed every Thing, went on board ten Ships of the Line new built, and an Engineer attended me in going round the Place.... I got no Plan of the Place, and put nothing down in writing, for I found that the whole Town had been talking of me, and thought it very extraordinary, that I should be allowed to go about and see every Thing.” At this time Clerk was only a sub-engineer in the corps of engineers (and therefore a lieutenant from 14 May 1757 when engineers were first given military rank), but he is referred to as Captain Clerk in most histories of the time and was also described on the Engineer List as "being with his regiment." He must therefore have also held a captaincy in the British Army, the engineers at this date not being part of the Army under its commander-in-chief but being ordnance troops under the command of the Master General of the Ordnance. Despite his relatively low rank Clerk mentioned his visit to Rochefort to the commander-in-chief of the British Army, General Ligonier, who asked him to put down his observations in a letter, which Clerk did on 15 July 1757.

By early August 1757 Rochefort had been decided by Pitt as the first target for his planned series of descents on the coast of France. Command of the expedition was given to Lt-Gen Sir John Mordaunt and "Clerk was appointed Chief Engineer, and the unprecedented step was taken of promoting him at a bound to the rank of Lieutenant-Colonel, he being at the time only a Lieutenant (Commission Book, No. 1270, p. 266). This is the sole instance on record of such rapid promotion having been given to any Engineer. Under him were Sub-Engineers Richard Dudgeon and Thomas Walker, and Practitioners Robert G. Bruce, Augustus Durnford, William Roy, and John C. Eiser."

== The Raid on Rochefort ==
The expedition left England on 8 September 1757 and on the 23rd the fleet entered Basque Roads, battered the fort on Île-d'Aix and captured the island. On the 24th Clerk was sent by Mordaunt to Aix to examine prisoners regarding the state of the defences of Rochefort but got no useful answers. After dinner Clerk went in the dark with Captain Howe of the Magnanime and Mr Boyd, the Controller of the Train, to reconnoitre Fouras. They landed at the tip of the promontory at low tide and walked over spongy ground for a couple of miles to within about a mile of the fort. On the 25th a council of war was held and it was determined that an attempt upon Rochefort was neither advisable nor practicable. Clerk again visited the Île d'Aix to examine prisoners, in particular a French engineer. His idea was to give the impression that he knew everything and to let the prisoners confirm his thoughts during casual conversation. On the 28th another council of war was held and it was resolved to land in Châtelaillon Bay, however, due to the tide and weather the landing that night was abandoned. Despite this, Clerk was further employed the next day in accompanying Maj-Gen Conway and Col Wolfe to carry out further reconnaissance of the proposed landing sites at Châtelaillon. Meanwhile, during the day of the 29th the demolition of the Aix fortifications was commenced: “The following two days were spent in blowing up the half-finished fortifications on the Island of Aix; and in doing of which, lest it be said that no blood was spilt upon our famous expedition, we managed so as to blow up a few of our own soldiers.” On 1 October 1757 the fleet weighed anchor and on the 6th arrived back in England.

== Inquiry and Court-Martial ==
On the return of the fleet with nothing to show for the great expense of the expedition, both Pitt and the King were understandably annoyed. On 1 November the King issued a warrant for an inquiry, Clerk being among the many called as witnesses. On the 21st it reported its findings and the King ordered Mordaunt to be tried by court-martial for disobeying his instructions.

The court-martial opened on 14 December 1757. Wolfe was quite clear in his mind, “The whole affair turned upon the impracticability of escalading Rochefort, and the two evidences brought to prove that the ditch was wet (in opposition to the assertions of the Chief Engineer, who had been in the place), are persons to whom, in my mind, very little credit should be given. Without their evidence we should have landed, and must have marched to Rochefort; and it is my opinion that the place would have surrendered or been taken in forty-eight hours.” Clerk was quizzed at some length and, though being always careful to say he could only say what he had seen more than 3 years before, he maintained his assertion that not all of the ditch around the town could be flooded as parts of it were higher than the tide could reach.

== Subsequent career ==
Despite having been instrumental in the choice of Rochefort as a target, Clerk seems to have escaped any blame for the failure; indeed, he was associated with Wolfe as a bold, adventurous young officer held back from capturing Rochefort by the timidity and indecisiveness of superannuated commanders. Clerk continued to mix with the highest levels of society. On 1 December 1757, while both he and Wolfe were on notice to be witnesses at Mordaunt's court-martial, Wolfe wrote to his mother, “(Tomorrow) night I am to meet (the) guest (of my old friend Rich), who is sent by the King of Prussia; Mr. Keith, our late envoy at Vienna; a son of Field-Marshal Count Lacy's; and Colonel Clarke, the engineer. These, with myself, make five very odd characters, and for the oddity of the mixture I mention it to you.” Clerk's particular talents were much lauded by some; Lord Bute said of him, “With regard to Clarke, I know him well: he must be joined to a general in whom he has confidence, or not thought of. Never was a man so cut out for bold and hardy enterprises; but the person who commands him must think in the same way of him, or the affair of Rochfort will return.” This was a prescient remark because even as it was written on 8 September 1758, Clerk's impetuosity was getting him into trouble. In 1758 Clerk, who had resigned from the Corps of Engineers on 1 January 1758, was appointed to the staff for the expedition to Cherbourg in Brittany. After taking and burning Cherbourg the expedition, led by Major-General Edward Bligh, made an ill-advised attempt to take St Malo, but the land forces were abandoned by the navy and had to fight a disastrous rear-guard action at St. Cast. Clerk's conduct in this action led to his arrest:

“General Blighe… had been actuated, during the course of these enterprises, by a young Lord Fitz-morrice and the adventurer Clarke, who diverted himself from the ships with the difficulties his comrades found in re-embarking. But he was on the point of falling under the punishment due to his arrogance: depending on his interest in the General, he had broken the arrest under which he had been put, for some misdemeanour, by Cunningham, his commanding officer; the same Cunningham, whose handsome behaviour at Minorca I have mentioned: at his return from thence he had been preferred by the Duke, who told him he had been misinformed of his character, and was sorry he had not sooner known his merit. At their return from St. Cas, Cunningham insisted on bringing Clarke before a Court-Martial. The Princess (Princess Augusta of Saxe-Gotha, Dowager Princess of Wales) unwisely countenanced the latter, who had made himself odious to the Army, and who escaped.” Even while Clerk was under arrest he continued to exert his charm. On 16 October 1758 “Clarke was talked to by the Princess yesterday much more than any body in the room.”

Despite his court-martial, Clerk progressed through the ranks of the army becoming colonel on 19 February 1762, major-general on 25 May 1772, lieutenant-general on 29 October 1777 and general on 12 October 1793, before dying on 22 May 1797.

== Affair and Marriage to the Countess of Warwick ==
Clerk embarked on an affair with Elizabeth Greville, Countess of Warwick, wife of Francis Greville, 1st Earl of Warwick, prior to the year 1760. The Earl of Warwick separated from his wife in September 1760 assuring Elizabeth an income of £2,000 per year. They later lived in Clerk House, Marylebone, newly designed for the couple by architect Robert Adam. Both Clerk and Elizabeth were quietly married in the English Ambassador's Chapel in Paris in February 1774, after her husband the Earl had died in 1773.
