= Charles Francis Greville =

British antiquarian, collector, and politician (1749–1809)

The Right Honourable Charles Francis Greville FRS
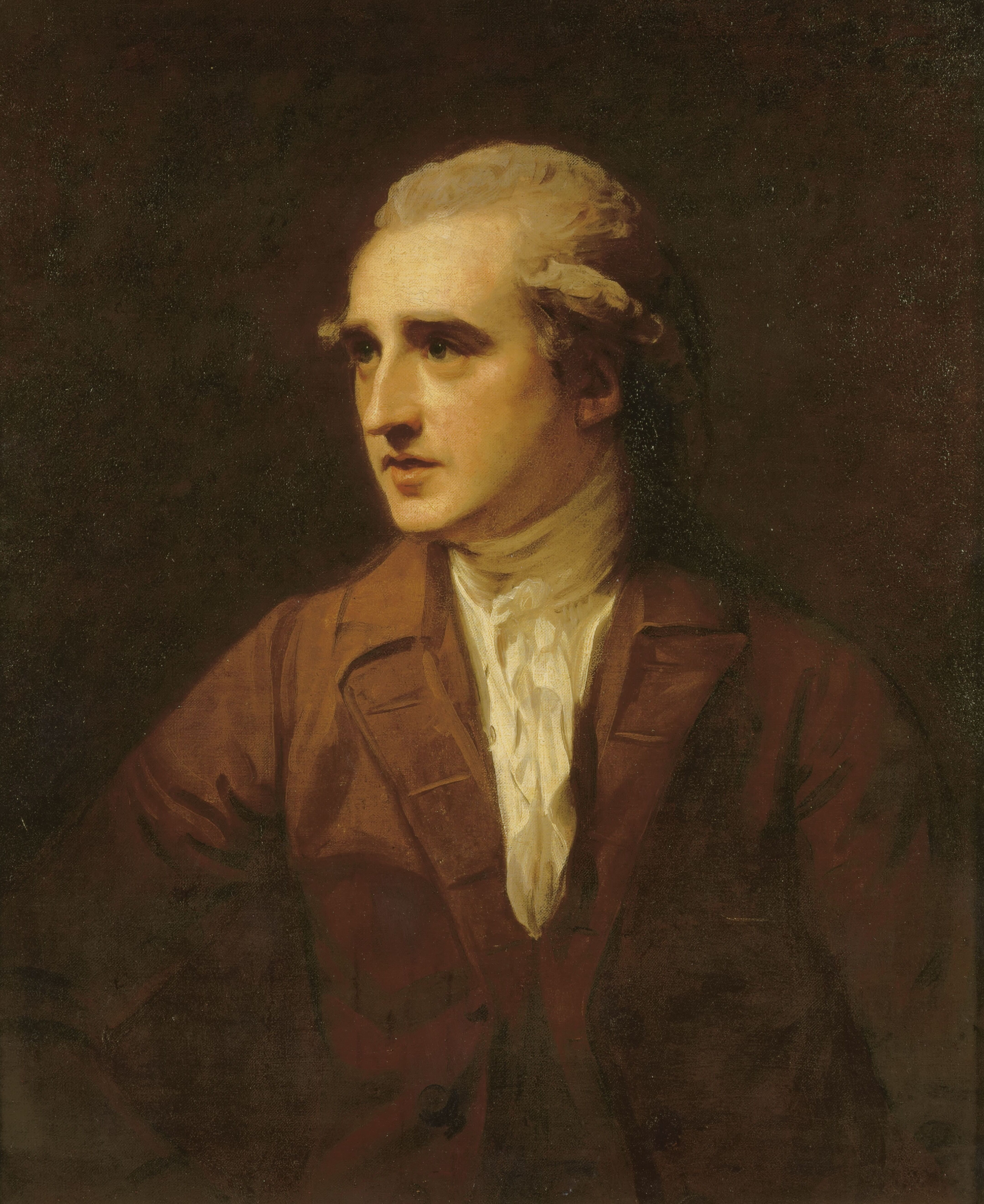
- Portrait by George Romney, c. 1781–1787

Treasurer of the Household
- In office 1783–1784
- Monarch: George III
- Prime Minister: William Pitt the Younger
- Preceded by: The Earl of Effingham
- Succeeded by: The Earl of Courtown

Vice-Chamberlain of the Household
- In office 1794–1804
- Monarch: George III
- Prime Minister: William Pitt the Younger; Henry Addington
- Preceded by: Lord Herbert
- Succeeded by: Lord John Thynne

Personal details
- Born: 12 May 1749
- Died: 23 April 1809 (aged 59)

Charles Francis Greville PC FRS FRSE FLS FSA (12 May 1749 – 23 April 1809) was a British antiquarian, collector and politician who sat in the House of Commons from 1774 to 1790.

== Early life ==
Greville was the second son of Francis Greville, 1st Earl of Warwick, and his wife, Elizabeth Hamilton, daughter of Lord Archibald Hamilton. George Greville, 2nd Earl of Warwick, and Robert Fulke Greville were his brothers, and he had four sisters. He was brought up in the family home, Warwick Castle.

His father had been created Earl Brooke three years before he was born and in 1759 had successfully petitioned to have the prestigious medieval title of a more senior extinct line of his family, Earl of Warwick, conferred on him as the senior male heir of the family and lieutenant of the county.

He was educated at the University of Edinburgh from 1764 to 1767.

== Art collections ==
Classical and renaissance artwork

Greville lived most of his adult life on a rigid income of £500 a year, generated from landowning and investments, with which managed to acquire antiquities from Gavin Hamilton in Rome. He also purchased through his uncle a genre piece by Annibale Carracci. Greville was the nephew of Sir William Hamilton, the British envoy at Naples who formed two collections of Greek vases, one of which is at the British Museum.

Stones and minerals

As a Fellow of the Royal Society, his special interest was in minerals and precious stones, which were catalogued by the émigré Jacques Louis, Comte de Bournon and were later purchased via Act of Parliament for the British Museum. He was good friends with James Smithson, whom he sponsored for membership in the Royal Society and with whom he exchanged minerals.

Horticulture

Greville remained for years a very close friend of Sir Joseph Banks and, like him, a member of the Society of Dilettanti. He accompanied Banks at the organizing meeting in March 1804 of the precursor to the Royal Horticultural Society, the Society for the Improvement of Horticulture.

Portraits of Emma Hart (later Lady Emma Hamilton)

Greville gave Amy Lyon the name of Mrs Emma Hart when he took her as mistress in 1782. He helped to educate her, and took her to George Romney's studio, where he was sitting for his own portrait. Romney became fascinated with the beautiful Emma, and painted allegorical "fancy pictures" of Emma in various guises forty-five times.

== Political career ==
When his father died in 1773 and his brother became Earl of Warwick, Greville effectively inherited the latter's seat (one of two for the Borough of Warwick) in the unreformed House of Commons. He was appointed in 1774 and held the seat until 1790. He served as a Lord of the Treasury from 1780 to 1782, as Treasurer of the Household from 1783 to 1784 and as Vice-Chamberlain of the Household from 1794 to 1804 and was sworn of the Privy Council in 1783.

== Milford Haven ==
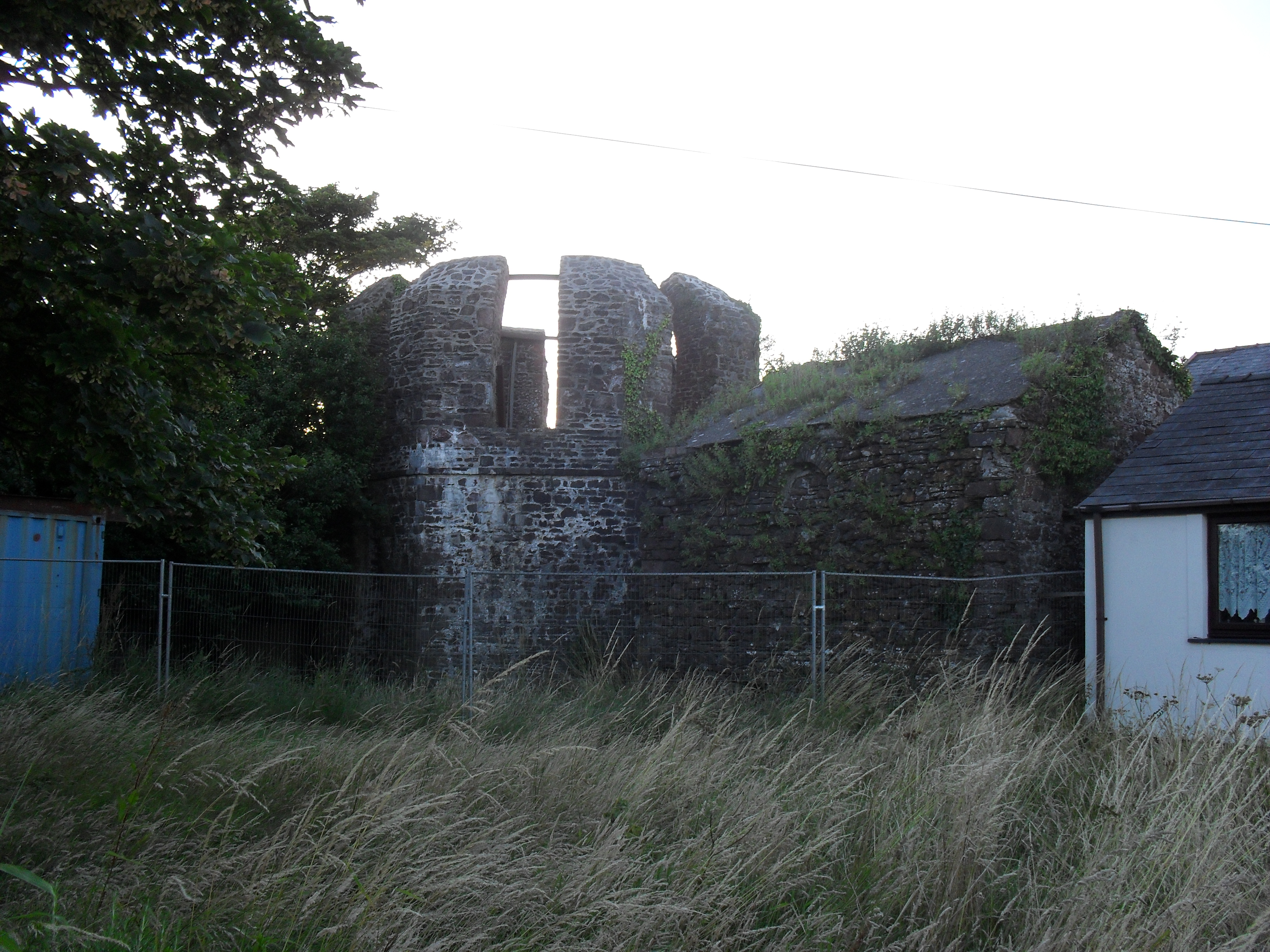
The Hakin Observatory

The construction of the seaport of Milford Haven, Pembrokeshire, South Wales, is due to Greville's entrepreneurial spirit. When it was the property of Sir William Hamilton, Greville applied for an Act of Parliament to enable Hamilton and his heirs to make docks, construct quays, establish markets, with roads and avenues to the port, to regulate the police, and make the place a station for conveying the mails. The first structure was a coaching inn. Quaker whaling ship owners from Nantucket were induced to settle, and for some decades Milford was a whaling port. A royal dockyard was established during the Napoleonic Wars. At his death in 1803, Hamilton bequeathed it to his nephew.

At a site on high ground in nearby Hakin, Greville planned to build the College of King George the Third to allow the study of mathematics and navigation, whose centrepiece would be an observatory. Although the observatory was built, and scientific instruments delivered, the college never functioned as such as after the death of Greville in 1809 the whole project was abandoned.

== Personal life ==
Greville never married, but had a liaison with Emma Hamilton for several years when she begged for his help after becoming pregnant with Sir Harry Fetherstonhaugh's child in 1782 and he rejected her. Greville took her in on condition that the child, Emma Carew, was fostered out, and Emma Hamilton became his mistress. He later helped to engineer her meeting and subsequent marriage to his uncle Sir William Hamilton, perhaps in an attempt to win his favour and also to clear the way for him (Greville) to finding a wealthy wife.

He lived for years in a house he had built facing Paddington Green, then a village on the outskirts of London, not far from the house in which he had installed Emma and her mother. He kept Romney's paintings of Emma on the walls of his house until his death. There he indulged his passion for gardening in a large garden provided with glasshouses in which he grew many rare tropical plants, aided by his connection with Banks, and managed to coax Vanilla planifolia to flower for the first time under glass, in the winter of 1806–07. His contributions to the herbarium assembled by Sir James Edward Smith are preserved by the Linnean Society of London. The Australasian genus Grevillea is named in his honour.

In the latter part of his life he lived at Warwick Castle. Greville died on 23 April 1809, aged 59.

== Recognition ==
Grevillea, a diverse genus of about 360 species of evergreen flowering plants in the family Proteaceae, is named after him, due to his role as a patron of botany and co-founder of the Royal Horticultural Society. Greville Island, in Australia, was named to honour his memory by Francis Barrallier, in 1820.

Greville plays a role in Susan Sontag's 1992 novel The Volcano Lover, about Sir William Hamilton.

Parliament of Great Britain
Preceded by Lord Greville; Paul Methuen	Member of Parliament for Warwick; 1774–1790; With: Paul Methuen 1774; Robert Fulke Greville 1774–80; Robert Ladbroke 1780–90	Succeeded by The Lord Arden; Henry Gage
Political offices
Preceded by The Earl of Effingham	Treasurer of the Household; 1783–1784	Succeeded by The Earl of Courtown
Preceded by Lord Herbert	Vice-Chamberlain of the Household; 1794–1804	Succeeded by Lord John Thynne
