= Lord Archibald Hamilton =

Royal Navy officer, politician and colonial administrator

Captain Lord Archibald Hamilton
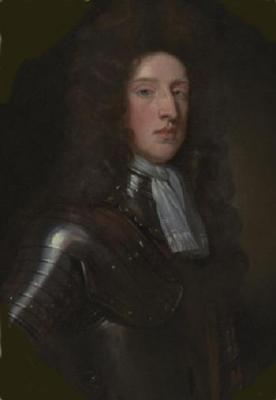
- Lord Archibald Hamilton
- Born: 1673
- Died: 5 April 1754 (aged 80–81)
- Spouse(s): Anne Cary Lucas; Anne, Lady Hamilton; Lady Jane Hamilton
- Children: Charles Hamilton; Elizabeth Greville, Countess of Warwick; Frederic Hamilton; Archibald Hamilton; William Hamilton; Jane Cathcart, Lady Cathcart
- Relatives: William Hamilton, Duke of Hamilton (father); Anne Hamilton, 3rd Duchess of Hamilton (mother)
- Military career
- Allegiance: England; Great Britain
- Branch: Royal Navy
- Rank: Captain
- Commands: HMS Sheerness; HMS Lichfield; HMS Berwick; HMS Expedition; HMS Torbay; HMS Boyne; HMS Eagle; HMS Royal Katherine; Greenwich Hospital
- Conflicts: War of the Spanish Succession

Member of Parliament for Lanarkshire
- In office 1708–1710
- In office 1718–1734

Member of Parliament for Queenborough
- In office 1735–1741

Member of Parliament for Dartmouth
- In office 1742–1747

Personal details
- Party: Whig

Captain Lord Archibald Hamilton (1673 – 5 April 1754) was a Royal Navy officer, Whig politician and colonial administrator who sat in the House of Commons of Great Britain from 1708 to 1747. In the 1690s, he was active in the English Channel pursuing French privateers, including Tyger out of Saint-Malo. Hamilton commanded the third-rate HMS Boyne at the Battle of Vigo Bay in October 1702 and then commanded the third-rate HMS Eagle at the Battle of Málaga in August 1704 during the War of the Spanish Succession. He was a controversial governor of Jamaica. Hamilton then joined the Board of Admiralty, ultimately serving as Senior Naval Lord.

== Naval career ==
Hamilton was baptised on 17 February 1673, the youngest son of William, Duke of Hamilton, and Anne, 3rd Duchess of Hamilton; his father had been created Duke of Hamilton for life in 1660. Hamilton studied at Glasgow University and was then sent to study under the Astronomer Royal, John Flamsteed, in London before taking a commission in the Royal Navy aboard the third-rate HMS Resolution. Promoted to post-captain on 11 September 1693, he was given command of the fifth-rate HMS Sheerness in 1694 and of the fourth-rate HMS Lichfield in 1697. In December 1695 he was active in the English Channel pursuing French privateers, including Tyger out of St Malo, an encounter commemorated in a painting by Willem van de Velde the Younger.

Hamilton went on to take command of the third-rate HMS Berwick in 1698, of the third-rate HMS Expedition in 1699 and of the third-rate HMS Torbay in 1702. After that he became captain of the third-rate HMS Boyne in September 1702 and commanded her at the Battle of Vigo Bay in October 1702 during the War of the Spanish Succession. He took command of the third-rate HMS Eagle in 1704 and commanded her at the Battle of Málaga in August 1704. He became captain of the second-rate HMS Royal Katherine in 1706.

== Political career ==
After his naval career, Hamilton saw a place in parliament as a way of finding favour with the Government and hopefully a lucrative office. At the 1708 general election, Hamilton stood for Parliament at Great Marlow, and also at the family seat of Lanarkshire. He was defeated at Marlow, but was returned in a hard-fought contest as Member of parliament (MP) for Lanarkshire. He opposed the Treason Act 1708, which altered Scottish law in direct contravention of the safeguards included in the Union, but his opposition was short lived as he sought payment for arrears with his pension. He supported the ministry in the vote for the impeachment of Dr Sacheverell and with the support of the Duke of Marlborough was appointed Governor of Jamaica in May 1710.

Hamilton did not stand at the 1710 general election and took up his post in Jamaica in 1711. He played a controversial role in setting up some of the founders of the infamous Bahamanian pirate gang, including Henry Jennings, Francis Fernando, and Leigh Ashworth, for which he was arrested and brought back to England in 1716 by the Royal Navy. He was acquitted by a board of Trade inquiry and released.

Hamilton was returned as MP for Lanarkshire at a by-election on 23 December 1718. He retained his seat at the 1722 British general election, with the help of his 19-year-old nephew, the 5th Duke of Hamilton, a Tory who was actually on the opposing side politically. He was returned again unopposed for Lanarkshire at the 1727 British general election and joined the Board of Admiralty under the Walpole–Townshend ministry in May 1729. He was advanced to First Naval Lord in June 1733 He did not stand at the 1734 British general election, but was returned as MP for Queenborough at a by-election on 22 February 1735. After he failed to support a bill for the Prince of Wales's allowance, he was forced to stand down as First Naval Lord in March 1738. However he was appointed cofferer and surveyor general to the Prince of Wales in 1738. He did not stand at the 1741 British general election, but was returned as MP for Dartmouth at a by election on 27 March 1742. He rejoined to Board, as Senior Naval Lord again, in March 1742 under the Carteret ministry and remained on the Board until the Broad Bottom ministry fell in February 1746. He served as Governor of Greenwich Hospital from 1746 until his death. He kept his post under the Prince of Wales until 1747, when he was turned out for refusing to follow him into opposition. He gratefully accepted a pension of £1,200 a year offered by the Prince.

For much of his life, Hamilton lived at Park Place at Remenham in Berkshire. He died on 5 April 1754.

== Family ==
Hamilton's first wife was Anne Cary (née Lucas) (a daughter of Charles Lucas, 2nd Baron Lucas and mother of Lucius Cary, 6th Viscount Falkland). She died in 1709 and Hamilton then married Lady Anne Hamilton in December 1718 (widow of Sir Francis Hamilton, 3rd Baronet Hamilton of Castle Hamilton, Killeshandra, Cavan, Ireland). She died in April 1719 and was buried in Westminster Abbey. Later that year, he married Lady Jane Hamilton (a daughter of the 6th Earl of Abercorn). Hamilton and his third wife later had six children:

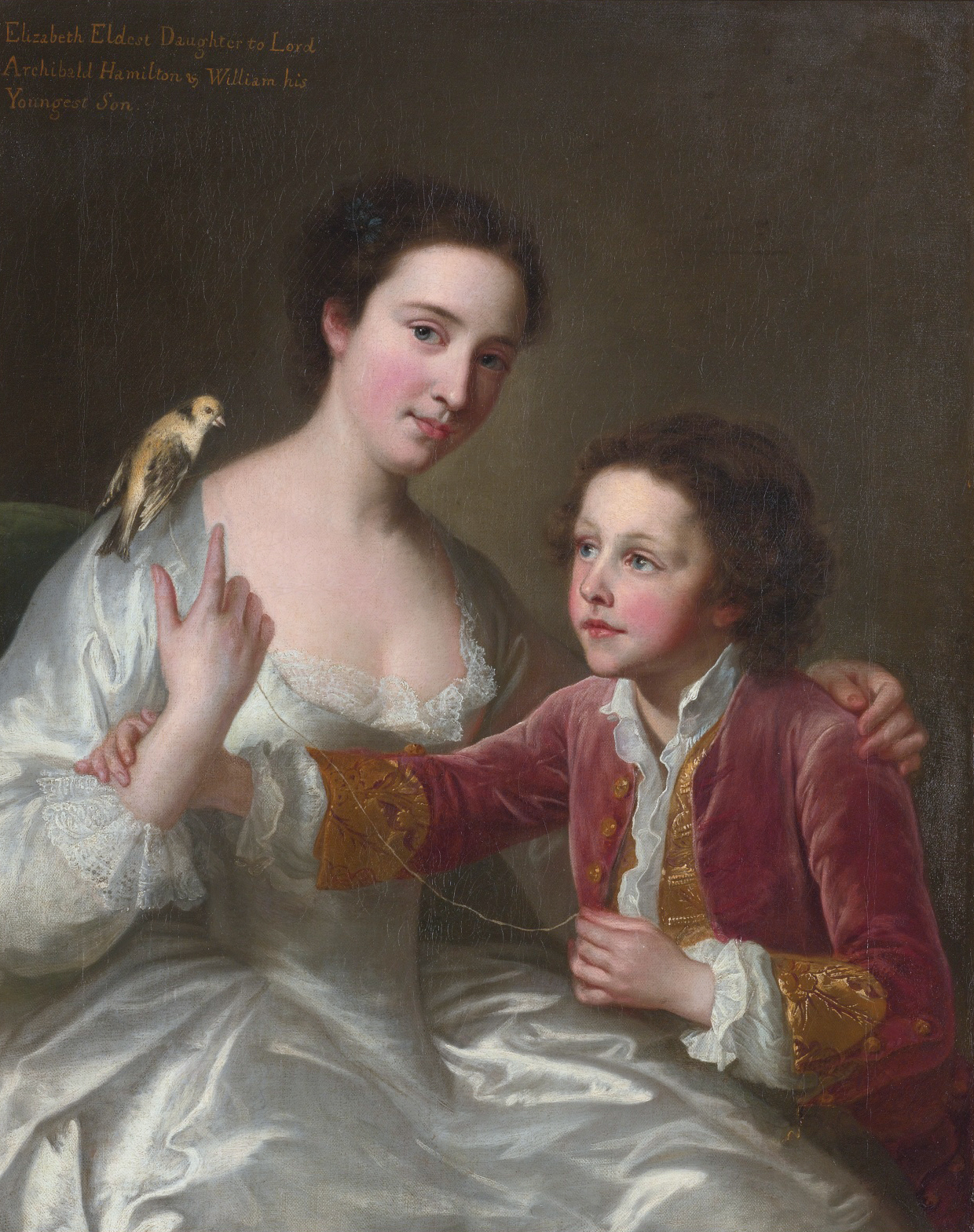
Elizabeth Hamilton, later Countess of Warwick (1720–1800), and her brother William Hamilton (1730–1803) (William Hoare)

- Charles (?–1751) married Mary Dufresne, had issue Mary Hamilton (diarist).
- Elizabeth (1720–1800), married Francis Greville, 1st Earl of Warwick (10 October 1719 6 July 1773).
- Frederic (1728–1811), religious minister, married 11 June 1757 Rachel Daniel, had issue Elizabeth, Countess of Aldborough.
- Archibald (accidentally drowned, 1744)
- William Hamilton (1730–1803), diplomat, married 25 January 1758 Catherine Barlow (died 1783). Married 6 September 1795 Emma Hart (died 1815).
- Jane (19 August 1726 – 13 November 1771), married 24 July 1753 Charles Schaw later Charles Cathcart, 9th Lord Cathcart.

== Sources ==
- Marshall, Rosalind K. (1973). The Days of Duchess Anne: Life in the Household of the Duchess of Hamilton 1656–1716. Harper Collins. ISBN 978-0002113380.
- Rodger, N.A.M. (1979). The Admiralty. Offices of State. Lavenham: T. Dalton Ltd. ISBN 0900963948.
- Woodard, Colin (2007). The Republic of Pirates. Harcourt, Inc. ISBN 978-0-15-603462-3. Archived from the original on 3 May 2007.

Parliament of Great Britain
New constituency	Member of Parliament for Lanarkshire; 1708 – 1710	Succeeded by Sir James Hamilton, Bt.
Preceded by James Lockhart	Member of Parliament for Lanarkshire; 1718 – 1734	Succeeded by Lord William Hamilton
Preceded by Richard Evans; Sir George Saunders	Member of Parliament for Queenborough; 1735 – 1741; With: Richard Evans	Succeeded by Richard Evans; Thomas Newnham
Preceded by George Treby; Walter Carey	Member of Parliament for Dartmouth; 1742 – 1747; With: Walter Carey	Succeeded by Walter Carey; John Jeffreys
Government offices
Preceded by Thomas Handasyde	Governor of Jamaica; 1711–1716	Succeeded by Peter Heywood
Military offices
Preceded by Sir Charles Wager	Senior Naval Lord; 1733–1738	Succeeded by Lord Harry Powlett
Preceded by Lord Harry Powlett	Senior Naval Lord; 1742–1746	Succeeded by Lord Vere Beauclerk
Preceded by Sir John Balchen	Governor, Greenwich Hospital; 1746–1754	Succeeded by Isaac Townsend
