= Robert Greville =

Robert Greville may refer to:

- Robert Greville, 2nd Baron Brooke (1608–1643), Parliamentary commander
- Robert Greville, 4th Baron Brooke (c.1638–1677), Baron Brooke
- Robert Fulke Greville (1751–1824), British Army officer, courtier and politician
- Robert Kaye Greville (1794–1866), English botanist
- Robert Fulke Greville (landowner) (1800–1867), British politician, soldier and landowner
