= Jane Cathcart =

Wife of British ambassador to Russia (1726–1771)

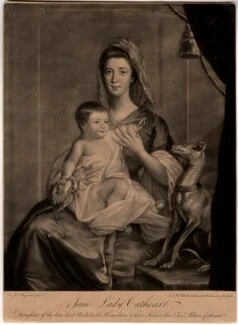
- Born: 19 August 1726; London, England
- Died: 13 November 1771 (aged 45); Saint Petersburg
- Spouse: Charles Cathcart, 9th Lord Cathcart
- Children: 9, including William, Louisa, and Charles
- Parents: Lord Archibald Hamilton; Lady Jane Hamilton

Jane, Lady Cathcart (née Hamilton; 19 August 1726 – 13 November 1771) was a Scottish aristocrat who was the wife of Lord Cathcart, the British ambassador to the Russian Empire. She was a personal friend of Catherine the Great and a patron to Josiah Wedgwood.

== Life ==
Cathcart, born in London in 1726 in London, was he daughter of Lord Archibald Hamilton, the governor of the Royal Naval Hospital in Greenwich and youngest son of Anne Hamilton, 3rd Duchess of Hamilton. Her mother, Lady Jane Hamilton, was his second wife and was also said to be the mistress of Frederick, Prince of Wales

On 24 July 1753, at her father's Royal Naval Hospital, she married Charles Cathcart, 9th Lord Cathcart.

Her husband was offered the role of Ambassador to Russia despite his lack of diplomatic experience, as it was not an attractive appointment. He is thought to have accepted it because he needed the money. He was there for some years but he made significant mistakes. However, Jane became a personal friend of Catherine the Great. She told the Empress about the work of her brother, Sir William Hamilton, who was an antiquarian. Cathcart was a patron to Josiah Wedgwood and her influence helped to create the sale of the Wedgwood Frog Service. The service was created in 1773–74 and is considered to be one of Josiah Wedgwood's greatest achievements. The pottery was stamped with a frog and the pieces contained views of notable British buildings, gardens and antiquities. The majority of the service is now in the Hermitage Museum.

== Personal life and children ==
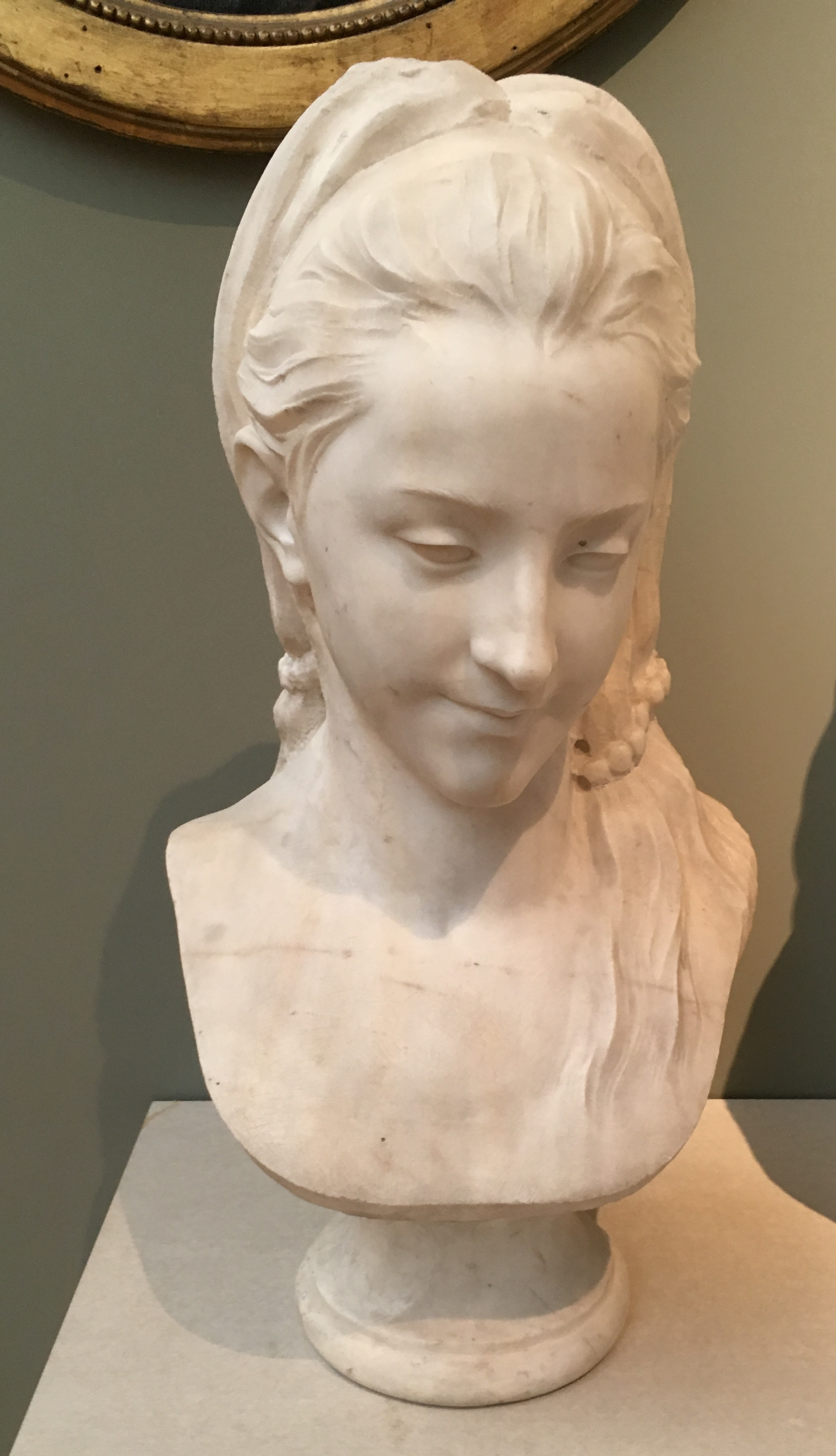
Bust of her daughter Mary

On 24 July 1753 she married Charles Cathcart, 9th Lord Cathcart.

They had nine children and six survived:

- Jane (20 May 1754 – 5 December 1790), first wife of the John Murray, 4th Duke of Atholl
- William Cathcart, 1st Earl Cathcart (17 September 1755 – 16 June 1843)
- Mary (1 March 1757 – 26 June 1792), a celebrated beauty, who married Thomas Graham, 1st Baron Lynedoch
- Louisa (1 June 1758 – 11 July 1843), married first, David Murray, 2nd Earl of Mansfield (1727–1796); married second, The Hon. Robert Fulke Greville
- Charles (28 December 1759 – 10 June 1788)
- John (23 April 1761 – 00 January 1762)
- Archibald (25 July 1764 – 10 October 1841)
- [a son] (7 June 1768; stillborn)
- Catherine Charlotte (8 July 1770 – 20 October 1794), died unmarried
