= Asplin =

Asplin is a surname. Notable people with the surname include:

- Per Asplin (1928–1996), Norwegian pianist, singer, composer, and actor
- Richard Asplin (born 1972), English novelist
- William Asplin (1686/7–1758), British writer

== See also ==
- Esplin
