= George North (numismatist) =

English cleric and numismatist

George North (1707–1772) was an English cleric and numismatist.

== Life ==
The son of George North, citizen and pewterer, who resided in or near Aldersgate Street in London, he was educated at St Paul's School. In 1725 he entered Corpus Christi College, Cambridge, where he graduated B.A. 1728, M.A. 1744.

North was ordained deacon in 1729, and went to officiate as curate at Codicote in Hertfordshire, near Welwyn, a village of which he was also curate. In 1743 he was presented to the vicarage of Codicote, and held this small living until his death. In 1744 he was appointed chaplain to Lord Cathcart.

North collected English coins, and corresponded on English numismatics and antiquities with Andrew Ducarel. In 1742 he was elected a fellow of the Society of Antiquaries of London; he was also a member of the Spalding Society. In 1750 he made a tour in the west of England, visiting Dorchester, Wilton, and Stonehenge, but from this time suffered from illness.

Around 1751 North, with George Vertue and Ducarel, was one of the leaders of resistance in the Society of Antiquaries to the perceived ambitions of Martin Folkes. The outcome was that the Society was incorporated in its own right, avoiding any move to amalgamate it into the Royal Society. North also worked to write the Society's history, a related attempt to shore up its prestige. He was baffled in trying to connect the Society of Antiquaries of the 18th century with that of the early 17th century. There were no sources to prove continuity with the group meeting in the time of James I, a lack he made known.

During a period of bad health around 1765, a number of North's papers were burnt as he asked. He died on 17 June 1772, aged 65, at his parsonage-house at Codicote, and was buried at the east end of Codicote churchyard. He was unmarried. He left his library and coins to Anthony Askew and Michael Lort.

== Works ==
North attracted the attention of Francis Wise and other antiquaries by An Answer to a Scandalous Libel intituled The Impertinence and Imposture of modern Antiquaries displayed, published anonymously in 1741, a reply to William Asplin. In 1752 he published Remarks on some Conjectures (London), in answer to a paper by Charles Clarke on a coin found at Eltham. In this pamphlet North discussed the standard and purity of early English coins. He corresponded with the numismatist Patrick Kennedy on the coins of Carausius and Allectus.

Among North's books was his manuscript account of Saxon and English coins, with drawings by Edward Hodsol. It later came into the possession of Rogers Ruding, with two plates engraved by North to accompany a dissertation (not completed) on the coins of Henry III. North also compiled A Table of English Silver Coins from the Conquest to the Commonwealth, with Remarks: a transcript by Andrew Gifford was in 1780 in the collection of Mark Cephas Tutet. North's notes on Joseph Ames's Typographical Antiquities were made use of by William Herbert.

North drew up sale catalogues for the coin collections of the Earl of Oxford (1742) and of Richard Mead (1755); he also catalogued, in 1744, James West's series of Saxon coins and Ducarel's English coins. A paper on Arabic numerals in England, written by North in 1748, was published by Richard Gough in Archæologia (x. 360).

== Notes ==
Attribution

This article incorporates text from a publication now in the public domain: Lee, Sidney, ed. (1895). "North, George (1710-1772)". Dictionary of National Biography. Vol. 41. London: Smith, Elder & Co.
