= Portrait of Mrs Mary Graham =

1777 painting by Gainsborough

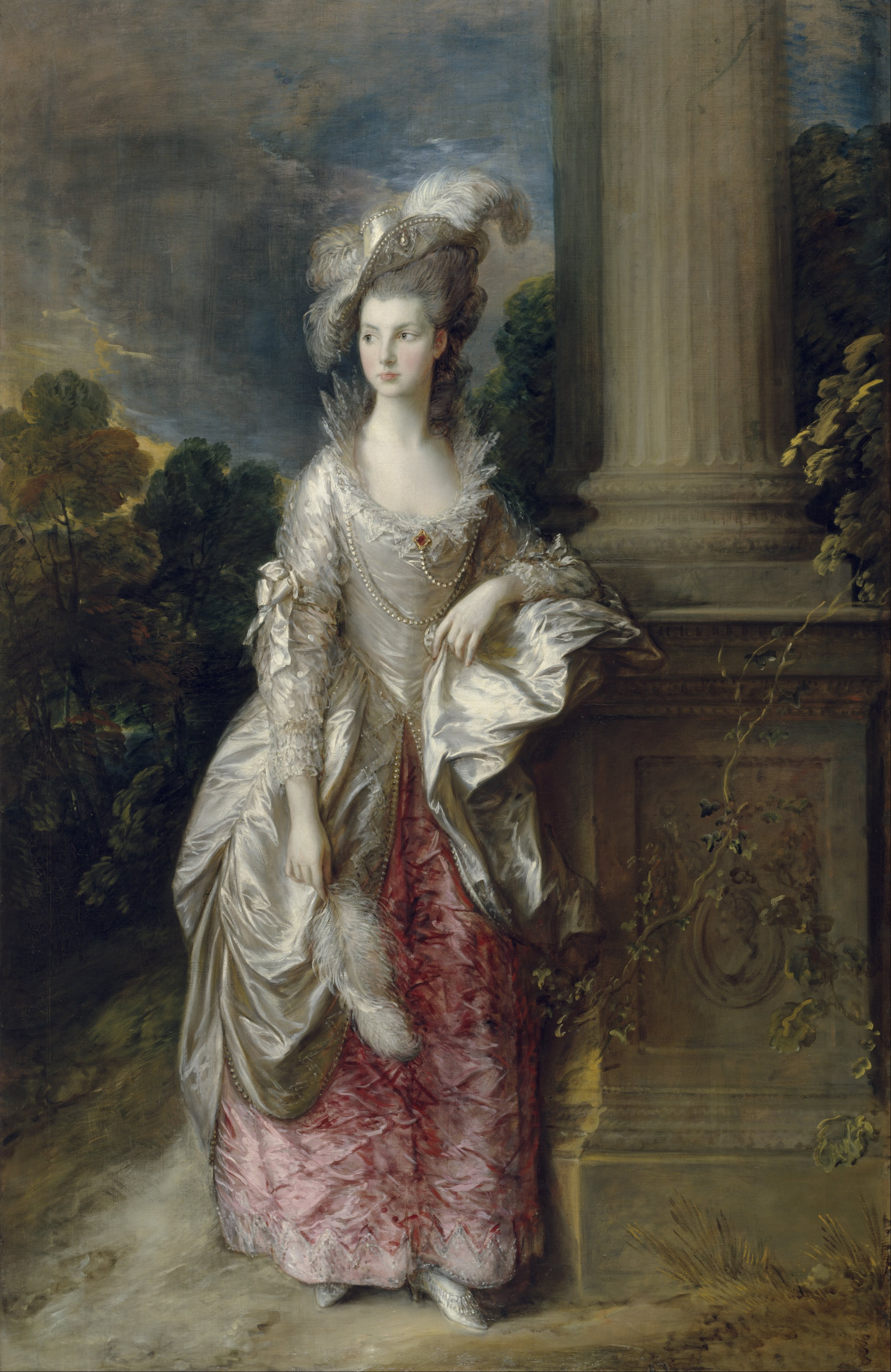
- Artist: Thomas Gainsborough
- Year: 1777
- Medium: Oil on canvas
- Dimensions: 237 cm × 154 cm (93 in × 61 in)
- Location: Scottish National Gallery, Edinburgh

Portrait of Mrs Mary Graham or The Honourable Mrs Graham is a 1777 oil on canvas painting by the British artist Thomas Gainsborough, produced shortly after Mary's marriage to Thomas Graham, the future Lord Lynedoch on 26 December 1774. It was one of the first works to enter the collection of the Scottish National Gallery in Edinburgh after its bequest in 1859 by the heirs of Thomas Graham.

== Description ==
It was displayed at the Royal Academy Exhibition of 1777 in London. One of Gainsborough's finest portraits, this full-length portrait has become an icon of the Scottish National Gallery.

It is one of three works the artist completed of Mary Graham. A more conventional half-length portrait, The Hon. Mrs. Thomas Graham, also completed between 1775 and 1777, is believed to be the painting that was initially commissioned. It is now part of the Widener collection in the National Gallery of Art in Washington, D.C.

The "Housemaid" portrayal of Mary Graham was rejected by her family, hence it was never finished and later sold after Gainsborough's death (d.1788) to the 5th Earl of Carlisle and was hung at Castle Howard, before it was donated to the Tate by the family in 1913.

== History ==
The sitter was born The Hon. Mary Cathcart (1 March 1757 – 26 June 1792). She was the daughter of Charles Cathcart, 9th Lord Cathcart and Jean Hamilton, Lord Cathcart had recently served as the British ambassador at the court of Catherine the Great to rectify his family's finance.

At age 17, Mary married Thomas Graham (later 1st Baron Lynedoch) in a double wedding with her older sister Jane, who married John Murray, 4th Duke of Atholl. Her younger sister Louisa was also advantageously married to Lord Stormont, while her brother William, later 1st Earl Cathcart was also painted by Gainsborough. Her maternal uncle was Sir William Hamilton, who married Emma Hamilton.

The Hon. Mrs. Thomas Graham by Gainsborough, National Gallery of Art between 1775 and 1777

It was Mary's looks that caused a stir when Gainsborough exhibited her full-length portrait at the Royal Academy in London in 1777. It secured her reputation as an icon of contemporary beauty and helped her to quickly become a prominent figure in the fashionable society of Georgian London. She attracted many admirers and friendships from Robert Burns to Georgiana, Duchess of Devonshire who recalled ‘her goodness, her sense, her sweetness’.

But Mary soon fell ill with tuberculosis. Throughout her illness, she was nursed attentively by her husband. They first moved to Brighton, and then, as her health deteriorated further, via revolutionary Paris to the Mediterranean, in search of warmer climates. They reached the sea, but she died on 26 June 1792, near Hyères, aged just 35.

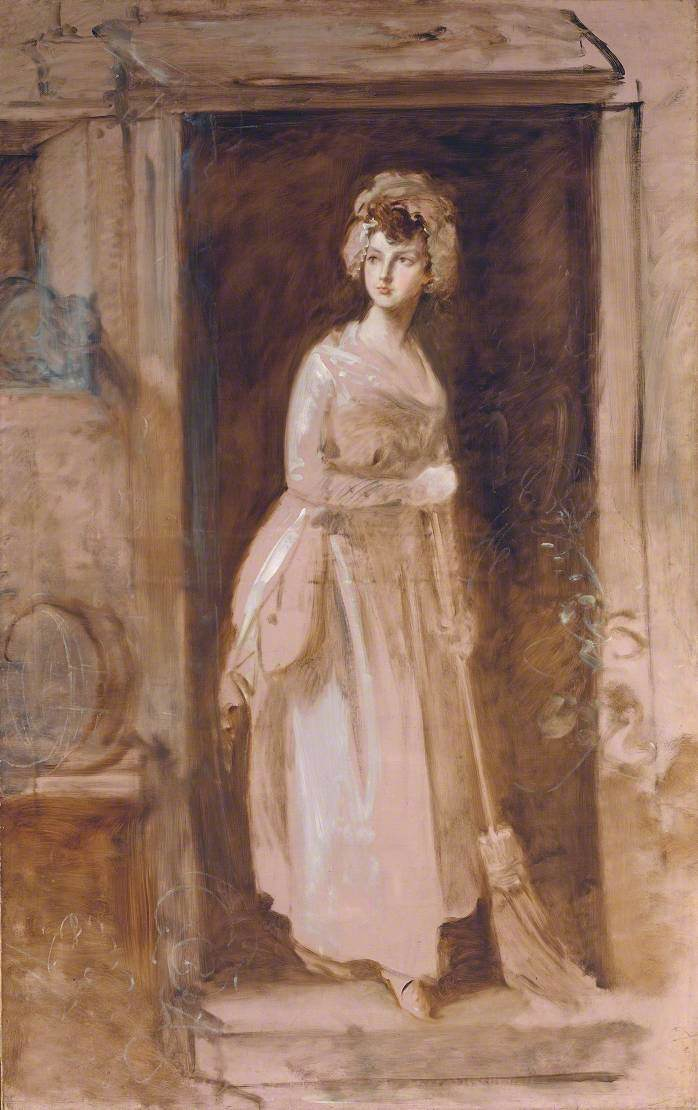
Thomas Gainsborough (1727-1788) "The Housemaid". When criticized that Mary's beauty came partially from her fancy clothes, Gainsborough ardently disagreed and made a point of sketching Mary in simple maid clothes. (Oil sketch life-size painting). Tate Museum

Thomas Graham lived another 50 years and died in 1843. He never remarried. He was so grief-stricken, he could not bring himself to look upon his wife's portrait. It was placed into storage and almost forgotten about, until it was exhibited 65 years later in Manchester in 1857. Two years later it was bequeathed by his cousin and heir, Robert Graham to the recently opened Scottish National Gallery.
