= Absolom (disambiguation) =

Absolom is a Belgian dance music group.

Absolom may also refer to:

- Absolom (name)
- Absolom motorcycles, Australian motorcycle manufacturer

== See also ==
- Absolum, 2025 video game
