= Esplin =

Esplin is a Scottish surname. It is a form of the surname Absolom.

Notable people with the surname include:

- Donald Esplin, Australian architect, designer of The Astor in Sydney in 1923
- Mabel Esplin (1874–1921), British stained glass artist
- Ron Esplin (born 1944), American Mormon historian

== See also ==
- Esplin Islands, a group of two small islands and off-lying rocks lying northeast of Box Reef, off the south end of Adelaide Island
- Asplin
