= Henry Murray (British Army officer) =

British Army officer (1784–1860)

General Sir Henry Murray KCB
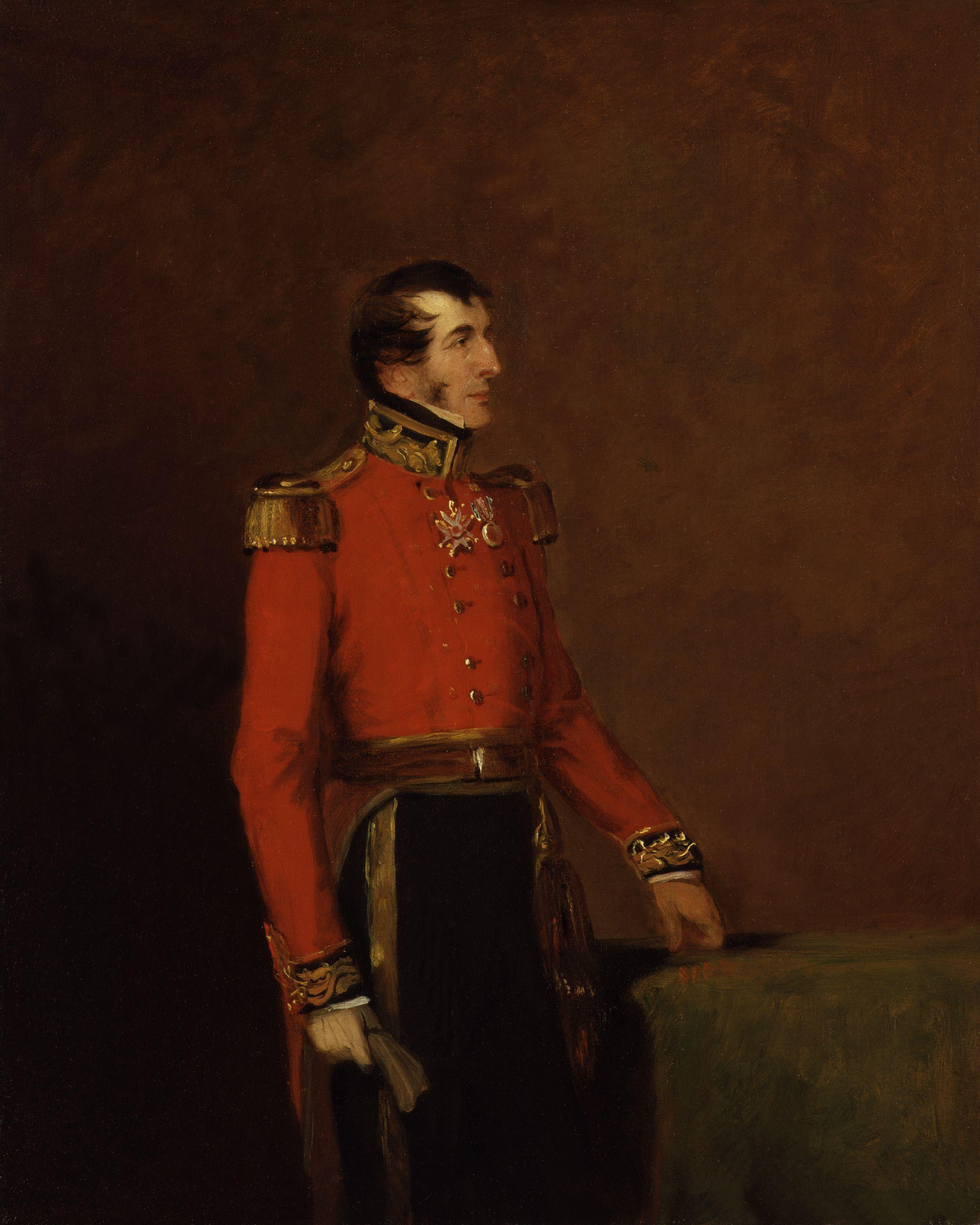
- Sir Henry Murray by William Salter
- Born: 6 August 1784
- Died: 29 July 1860 (aged 75)
- Military career
- Allegiance: United Kingdom
- Branch: British Army
- Rank: General
- Commands: Western District
- Conflicts: Napoleonic Wars
- Awards: Knight Commander of the Order of the Bath

General Sir Henry Murray KCB (6 August 1784 – 29 July 1860) was a distinguished British Army officer who fought in the Napoleonic Wars. As the younger son of an earl, he is sometimes styled "the Honourable".

== Biography ==
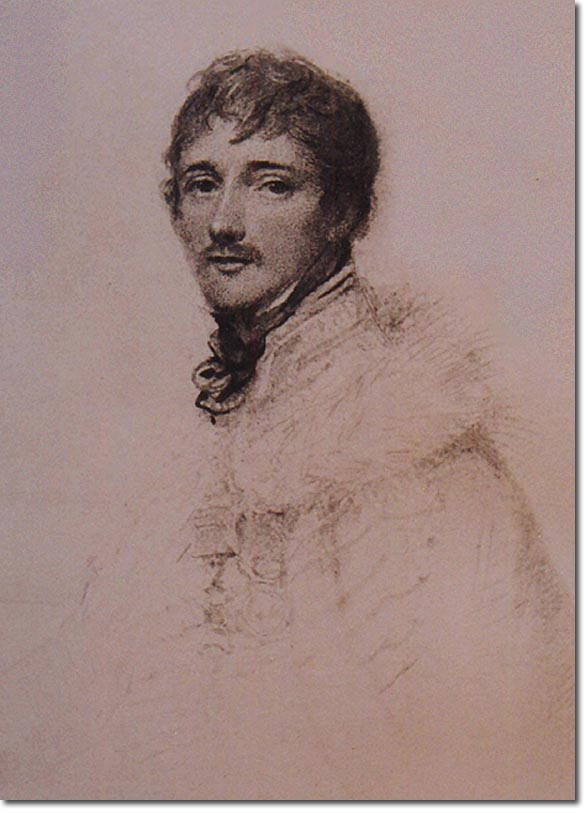
Murray as a 28 year-old is from a pencil drawing by Cosway made when he was a Lieutenant-Colonel commanding the 18th Hussars.

Murray, born 6 August 1784, was the fourth son of David Murray, 2nd Earl of Mansfield, and his second wife, Louisa, daughter of Charles Cathcart, 9th Lord Cathcart. His siblings included Lady Elizabeth and David Murray, 3rd Earl of Mansfield.

Murray was commissioned a cornet in the 16th Dragoons on 16 May 1800 and a second lieutenant on 11 June 1801. On 26 June 1801 he was promoted to first lieutenant in the 10th Dragoons, and a captain on 24 August 1802. He was a captain in the 20th Dragoons from 5 November 1802.

Between 1805 and 1807 he served as aide-de-camp for his uncle Lord Cathcart in Ireland and Egypt then as a major in the 26th Cameronians during the Walcheren Campaign (1809) and its siege of Flushing. Having joined the 26th on 26 March 1807 he remained with them for three years. On 2 August 1810 he joined the 18th Hussars as a major. He remained with the 18th Dragoons until the end of the Napoleonic Wars, being promoted to Lieutenant-Colonel of the Regiment on 2 January 1812. During a crossing of the Esla River while with the 18th Hussars, his horse fell severely injuring him after which he spent some time in the hospital at Palencia. He was present at the Battle of Morales (2 June 1813), despite still suffering from the severe wound to his knee.

Two days after, inflammation set in in the knee, yet he followed the regt. in a spring waggon in rear, till upon the representation of the surgeon that if he went on with the troops he must die, he was sent back to the hospital station at Palencia, where, with abscess and acute rheumatism, he nearly died

— Col. Malet's Records 18th Hus.

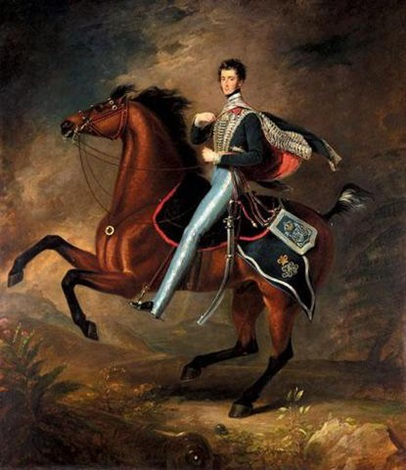
Henry Murray on his horse by Circle of James Northcote.

He took part in the Battle of Quatre Bras (16 June 1815) before leading the retreat the following day. At the Battle of Waterloo (18 June 1815) he led the 18th Hussars as part of Sir Hussey Vivian's charge at the conclusion of the battle.

He became General Officer Commanding Western District in 1842. During the latter part of his life, Murray resided at Wimbledon Lodge and died there on 29 July 1860. There is a memorial to him in St Mary's Church, Wimbledon and a further copy in the Garrison Church of the Royal Citadel, Plymouth.

== Family ==
De Visme's Naturalization Act 1798
- Act of Parliament
- Parliament of Great Britain
- Long title: An act for naturalizing Emily de Visme an infant.
- Citation: 38 Geo. 3. c. 61 Pr.
- Territorial extent: Great Britain

Dates
- Royal assent: 26 May 1798
- Commencement: 2 November 1797 (Note: Start of session.)

Status: Current legislation

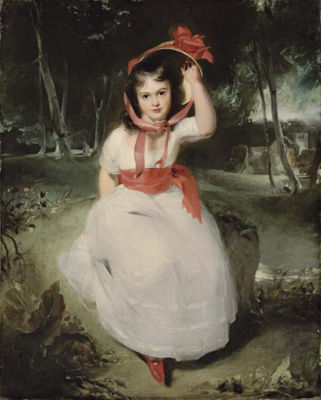
Emily de Vismé (1787–1873) by Sir Thomas Lawrence. (titled "The Woodland Maid", later given to their daughter Gertrude, sold for £1 million.)

On 28 June 1810 Murray married Emily, the illegitimate and only child of Gerard de Vismé, a wealthy French Huguenot and member of the British Factory in Lisbon. Emily's mother was unknown, but her father reappearance in London was influenced to bring up his only child in good society, she was then naturalized by her father through a private act of Parliament, De Visme's Naturalization Act 1798 (38 Geo. 3. c. 61 Pr.), that received royal assent in May 1798. Henry and Emily's children :

1. Susan Emily, born in Upper Seymour Street on 17 March 1811
2. Henry Stormont, born at Richmond in Surrey on 24 March 1812
3. Frederick Stormont, born at Brighton in Sussex on 23 March 1813
4. Gertrude Louisa, born at Brighton in Sussex on 4 November 1814
5. Arthur Stormont, born at Douglass near Cork on 22 February 1820.

Their son, Arthur Stormont Murray of the Rifle Brigade was killed at the age of 28 in August 1848 at the head of a company fighting the Boers at Bloem Platts in the Cape of Good Hope.He would ended up publishing a book memoir recollecting his fallen son.

The Murrays resided at Wimbledon Lodge, home commissioned for Gerard de Vismé, considered to be the village's finest Georgian building. Emily previously inherited the house when her father died and she was 10, hence why the house was rented to 3rd Earl Bathurst and the Rt. Hon. Ladies Ashburnham. The Murrays only lived there from 1824 until the house was demolished in 1904. Sir Henry became a major figure in local Wimbledon politics once his military career ended, and he was active in the Vestry, the municipal administration of the day.

In 1840, he vigorously opposed the prohibition of Wimbledon's annual Easter fair, describing it as one of the only celebrations "the labouring classes have the opportunity to enjoy."

Following Sir Henry's death, the family made significant contributions to the construction of the current St John's Church in the 1870s.

== Bibliography ==
- Bromley, Janet; Bromley, David (2015). Wellington's Men Remembered Volume 2: A Register of Memorials to Soldiers who Fought in the Peninsular War and at Waterloo- Volume II: M to Z. Pen and Sword. ISBN 978-1-4738-5768-1.
- Colburn, Henry (1843). United Service Magazine. p. 301.
- Haythornthwaite, Philip (2007). The Waterloo Armies: Men, Organization and Tactics. Pen and Sword. p. 71. ISBN 978-1-4738-1975-7.
- Philippart, John (1820), The Royal military calendar, or Army service and commission book. Containing the services and progress of promotion of the generals, lieutenant-generals, major-generals, colonels, lieutenant-colonels, and majors of the army, according to seniority: with details of the principal military events of the last century, vol. 4, London: Printed by A.J. Valpy, sold by T. Egerton etc., pp. 401–402

Attribution

Military offices
| Preceded by Robert Ellice | GOC Western District; 1842–1852 | Succeeded by Sir Harry Smith |
