= Louisa Murray, 2nd Countess of Mansfield =

Scottish noblewoman (1758–1843)

The Right Honourable The Countess of Mansfield
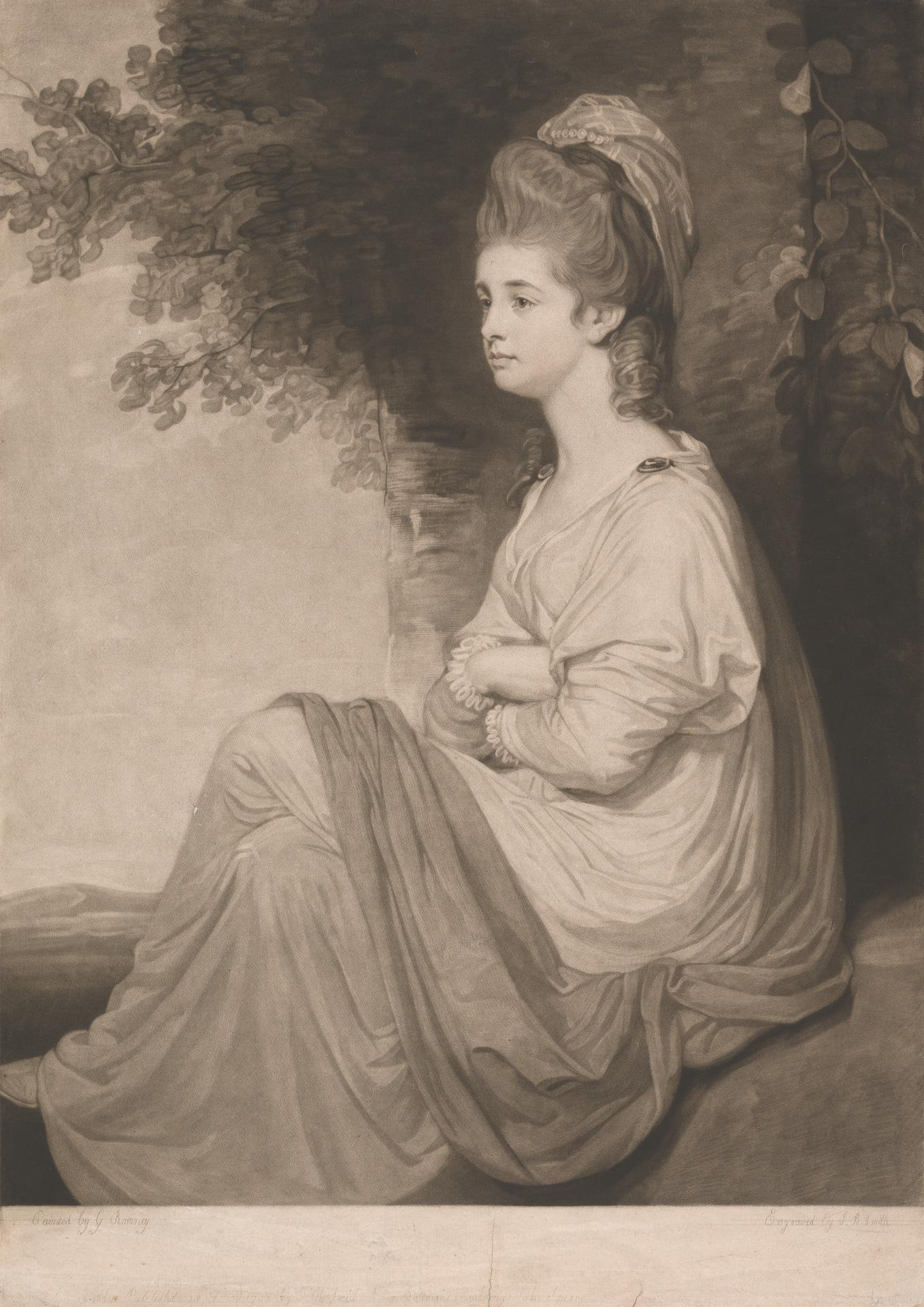
- Louisa, Lady Stormont
- Born: Hon. Louisa Cathcart; 1758
- Died: 11 July 1843 (aged 84–85)
- Burial place: Collegiate Church of St Mary, Warwick
- Spouses: David Murray, 2nd Earl of Mansfield (m. 1776; died 1796) Robert Fulke Greville (m. 1797; died 1824)
- Children: David William Murray, 3rd Earl of Mansfield; George Murray; Charles Murray; Sir Henry Murray; Lady Caroline Murray; Lady Georgiana Cathcart; Lady Louisa Finch-Hatton; Robert Fulke Greville
- Parent(s): Charles Cathcart, 9th Lord Cathcart (father); Jane Hamilton (mother)

Louisa Murray, 2nd Countess of Mansfield (née Cathcart, later Greville; 1758 – 11 July 1843), was a Scottish noblewoman. She married firstly to David Murray, 2nd Earl of Mansfield, and secondly to Robert Fulke Greville.

== Early life ==
Louisa was the daughter of Charles Cathcart, 9th Lord Cathcart, and his wife, the former Jane Hamilton, granddaughter of the 3rd Duchess of Hamilton. She was baptised on 1 July 1758 at Alloa. Her uncle was Sir William Hamilton

== Personal life ==
On 5 May 1776, Louisa married Scottish peer David Murray, then Viscount of Stormont. Thus she became the Viscountess of Stormont. It was the Viscount's second marriage, and he was thirty years older than Louisa. Their five children were:

- David William Murray, 3rd Earl of Mansfield (1777–1840)
- Lieutenant-General Hon. George Murray (1780–1848)
- Major Hon. Charles Murray (1781–1859), married Elizabeth Law and had issue
- General Hon. Sir Henry Murray (1784–1860), married Emily, daughter of Gerard de Vismé, and had issue
- Lady Caroline Murray (? – 1867)

The family seat was Scone Palace, but the Viscount was the British ambassador in Paris, where his close friend Madame du Deffand commented that his new wife "is pretty, she holds herself badly, and has not a charming manner, but her expression is full of intelligence". Queen Marie Antoinette once spoke to Lady Stormont, but she was so struck with her majesty that she couldn't speak and the Queen graciously continued talking as if Lady Stormont had addressed her.

Although her sister Mrs Graham was the celebrated beauty of the time, evidently the future First Lady Abigail Adams instead thought "The handsomest Woman I have seen in England was my Lady Stormont. She is really beautifull, for she has in her Countenance and manners a Modesty and a dignity, which must forever please." From her 1785 letter to her son John Quincy Adams.

Improvements to Scone Palace were worked on by George Paterson until 1783, when the house was considered suitable as a regular residence.

In 1776, Lord Stormont's uncle, William Murray, 1st Baron Mansfield was created Earl of Mansfield. He had no children of his own and so the title was created with a remainder to Louisa and her issue with Lord Stormont. The Complete Peerage notes: "The strange limitation of the Earldom in 1776 was doubtless owing to a notion then prevalent that no British peerage granted even in remainder to a Scottish peer would enable such peer to sit in Parliament. This was founded on the absurd resolution passed by the House of Lords in 1711 as to the like impotency of a British peerage granted to a peer of Scotland, which resolution was rescinded in 1782. Accordingly, in 1792, the limitation of the Earldom was made with a direct remainder to the grantee's nephew, though a peer of Scotland." Thus when her husband died in 1796, their son inherited the second creation. Louisa outlived her son and on her own death in 1843, the first creation was inherited by her grandson, William, the 4th Earl.

=== Second marriage ===
At the time of her first husband's death, Louisa was still in her thirties. She married again, this time to her first cousin, Lieutenant-Colonel Hon. Robert Fulke Greville (a younger son of Francis Greville, 1st Earl of Warwick and Elizabeth Hamilton), on 19 October 1797, at St Marylebone Parish Church. By her second husband she had a further three children:

- Lady Georgiana Greville (1798–1871), married General Sir George Cathcart and had issue
- Lady Louisa Greville (1800–1883), married Hon. Revd Daniel Heneage Finch-Hatton and had issue
- Hon. Robert Fulke Greville (1800–1867), married Georgiana (d. 1867), daughter of Charles Lock. Had a son named William Hamilton Greville (1826-1848).

Queen Charlotte sent a letter to Lady Mansfield on 5 January 1801 writing:

Madam, I have communicated the contents of your letter to his Majesty, who perfectly agrees with you & Mr Greville that the Princes of Orleans, being foreigners of distinction, should have leave to pass through Richmond Park. I should have answered yesterday had I not received the letter too late for the post.

I rejoice to hear that you are so well recovered after your confinement, but tho I do hear that the little boy (Robert) is equal in beauty to his sister, I hope not to displease when I say that dear sweet little Georgina will bear the prize with me.

I beg my compliments to Mr Greville & am my dear Lady Mansfield's affectionate friend.

Lady Mansfield's portrait was painted by George Romney. She died on 11 July 1843 and was buried in her second husband's family tomb in the chapter house at the Collegiate Church of St Mary, Warwick.

Peerage of Great Britain
| Preceded by William Murray | Countess of Mansfield; 1793–1843 | Succeeded by William David Murray |
