= Charles Clarke (numismatist) =

English numismatist and vicar

Charles Clarke (20 February 1719 – 16 November 1780) was an English numismatist and antiquarian. He served as vicar of Elm from November 1762.

Clarke was born in Kensington, into the supposedly ancient Clarke family. He attended Oxford from 1736, where he failed to graduate, going on to take holy orders. Clark's first and only numismatic work Some conjectures relative to a very antient piece of money (1751), which incorrectly identified a recently discovered coin, proved to be an utter failure. It was refuted swiftly and unsympathetically by numismatist George North, who correctly identified the coin as a common Peny-yard pence.

Even if some unassociated conclusions were true, Clarke was humiliated, feeling his "reputation and character" damaged by North's response. Clarke attempted some later publications, including a bitter refutation of one of North's works, but none ever came to fruition. Other than his Conjectures and a poorly regarded genealogy (published posthumously), none of Clarke's antiquarian work survives. Feeling a conspiracy against him, Clarke stopped paying his dues to the Society of Antiquaries, and was finally kicked out in 1765. In 1762, he retired to Elm, serving as a vicar, where he remained for the rest of his life.

== Early life and family ==
Charles Clarke was born in Kensington, London on 20 February 1719, as the seventh son of Rupert Clarke of Heston (1674–1748), attorney of the Court of King's Bench, and Dorothy Clarke, née Radcliffe. Charles Clarke composed an account of the family's genealogy, published posthumously in The Gentleman's Magazine. The article claimed the family descended from Ranulf le Meschin, Norman magnate of Cumberland, tracing the family through several administrators and merchants, up to himself.

Clarke was first educated at Winchester College, then entering Balliol College, Oxford. Here, he matriculated on 9 December 1736, aged 17. Clarke seems to have attended until at least September 1738, not graduating afterwards, though he later took holy orders at the university.

== Career ==
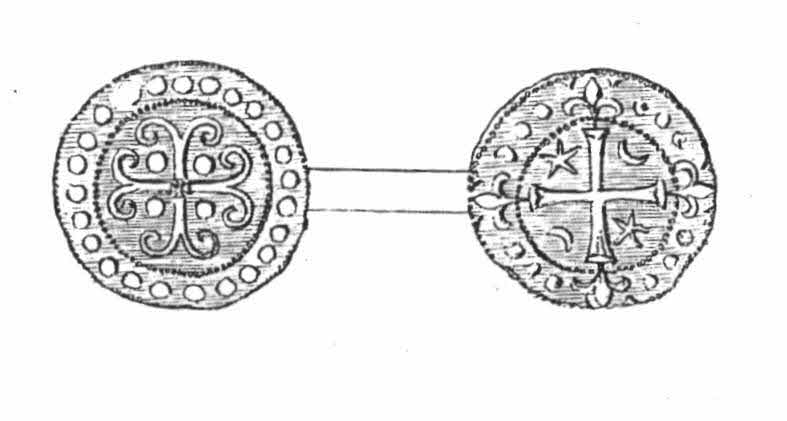
Engraving of the "Eltham Coin" in Clarke's Conjectures.

In 1751, Clarke published a short, 26-page pamphlet, entitled Some conjectures relative to a very antient piece of money lately found at Eltham in Kent. This book concerned a coin, now known as the "Eltham Coin", found by a labourer in Eltham in 1750, which Clarke found to be well preserved and having the "adorandi rubigo [offering rust]" of much age. Clarke claimed the coin was an exceptionally rare coin from the reign of Richard I (r. 1189–1199), citing its similarity to some seals of Richard I. This thesis met with a reply, in 1752, from the fellow numismatist, Reverend George North, in his Remarks on 'Some Conjectures...'. North's Remarks inescapably proved the coin was, rather than an exceptional artifact:

a piece of the base money denominated Peny-yard pence from their being stamped or made at Peny-yard, a place near Ross in Herefordshire, about the time of Henry iii [r. 1216–1272], when this sort of money is supposed to have begun to be made at the forges there for the currency of the workmen employed at them.

The Peny-yard pence was an ordinary coin, well known to numismatists at the time, with none of the remarkable features Clark had fancied. North's merciless remarks proved a humiliation for Clarke, as he attempted to recover by his reputation in a refutation of North, 'Remarks on an Epistolary Dissertation on some Supposed Saxon Gold Coins', refuting a treatise which had been appended to his Remarks. Clarke advertised the retort several times, and it was apparently read before the Society of Antiquaries of London but, by the time of his death, it had never materialised in print. North responded to these advertisements mockingly in a letter to Andrew Ducarel:

Mr. Clarke's advertisement has been lent me, by which I find he wants to spit some venom at me, and is industriously particular in denoting to the world who it is directed against. I heartily laugh at such petulant anger, merely because his errors have been pointed out. If he proves any error upon me I will set him a good example by as publicly retracting; but he shall be convinced I do not want spirit to defend what is right. I doubt not you have heard, what he informed Mr. Sandby my publisher, that he has complained of me to Mr. [Martin] Folkes and several of the Members [of the Society of Antiquaries]; which I look on as a childish endeavour to bring the affair coram non Judice, as the Conjectures and my Remark on them, were wrote, and the latter in the press, before he was admitted or chose a Member of the Society. He says my Remarks have been attended with very bad consequences to his reputation and character; if this be really fact, it is through his own inaccuracy, and not any malevolence in me, who desire to injure no man living.

In his Conjectures, Clarke had appended a more successful essay: 'Remarks on a dissertation on Oriuna, the supposed wife of Carausius'. "Oriuna" was a name, referenced in the coins of the self-declared Emperor of Britannia, Carausius, whose supposed identity was being hotly debated between numismatists Patrick Kennedy and William Stukeley, with Kennedy proposing her as the emperor's guardian goddess, and Stukeley proposing his wife. Clarke correctly concluded that the name did not refer to a person, but was rather a misreading of the Latin word "fortuna" on Carausius' poorly preserved coins. Clarke's vindication here did little to comfort his ego.

Records survive of several works Clarke attempted after the Conjectures. Announced in the Conjectures, apparently to be his principal work, a volume entitled The Hebrew, Samaritan, Greek, and Roman Medallist was never published. Clarke claimed, in his 1815 genealogy, that he had attempted to read two dissertations to the Society of Antiquaries, but was refused "through the persuasion of two drones, P. C. Webb and C. D.". After this incident, Clarke refused to pay his dues to the Society, and was removed in 1765, owing eleven years worth of dues. If Clarke made any further antiquarian inquiries, these do not survive, barring his 1815 genealogy, which historian C. E. A. Cheesman regards as "no less muddled and misleading than his earlier numismatic work".

On 22 September 1762, Clarke was appointed to the vicarage of Elm, Cambridgeshire by Bishop of Ely, Matthias Mawson. On 16 March 1773, Clarke was nominated to be the poor vicar of Canterbury or Ely who was to be given a sum of money from the royal bounty for his upkeep, but Thomas Robins Ellis (d. 1788), clergyman at Whittlesey, won the funds instead. Clarke maintained this position at Elm until his death.

== Personal life and death ==
Clarke was married twice. His first marriage was to Elizabeth Archer, and his second to the widow of Christopher Southgate, Sarah Southgate. Clarke had no children of his own, but adopted two of Southgate's from her former marriage. Clarke died on 16 November 1780, in Elm. He was buried in All Saints Church, Elm, where, over the priest's door, a memorial tablet is placed.

== Sources ==
- "Person: Clark, Charles (1762 - 1780)". Clergy of the Church of England database (CCEd).
- Cheesman, C. E. A. (2008). "Clarke, Charles (1719–1780)". Oxford Dictionary of National Biography (online ed.). Oxford University Press. doi:10.1093/ref:odnb/5487. (Subscription or UK public library membership required.)
- Clarke, Charles (1815). "Some Account of the Family of Clarke, of Heston, co. Middlesex; Chiefly Collected from the Antient Records of the City of Exeter". The Gentleman's Magazine. 85 (2): 205–207.
- Crowther-Beynon, V. B. (1929). "Some Notes on 'Peny-Yard Pence'" (PDF). British Numismatic Journal. 20: 123–135.
- Goodwin, Gordon (1887). "Clarke, Charles (d.1767)" . In Stephen, Leslie (ed.). Dictionary of National Biography. Vol. 10. London: Smith, Elder & Co.
- Nichols, John (1812). Literary Anecdotes of the Eighteenth Century, Vol. 5. London: Nichols, Son, & Bentley.
- Sweeting, W. D. (1900). "Monumental Inscriptions in Elm Church [containing a transcription of Clarke's monument]". Fenland Notes and Queries. 4: 251–4, 303–4.
