= John Williams (Windsor MP) =

John Williams (30 October 1766 – after 1810) was elected as a Tory Member of Parliament (MP) for Windsor at the general election in July 1802. However, on 16 February 1804, his election was declared void after an election petition.

Parliament of the United Kingdom
Preceded by Sir William Johnston, Bt; Robert Fulke Greville	Member of Parliament for Windsor; 1802–1804; With: Robert Fulke Greville	Succeeded by Arthur Vansittart; Robert Fulke Greville
