= Comic novel =

Novel-length work of humorous fiction

A comic novel is a novel-length work of humorous fiction. Many well-known authors have written comic novels, including P. G. Wodehouse, Henry Fielding, Mark Twain, and John Kennedy Toole. Comic novels are often defined by the author's literary choice to make the thrust of the work—in its narration or plot—funny or satirical in orientation, regardless of the putative seriousness of the topics addressed.

== Definition ==
Novels, books, plays, and many works of fiction or art can certainly contain and include passages or themes that are comic, humorous or satirical, but the defining characteristic of this genre is that comedy is the framework and baseline of the story, rather than an occasional or recurring motif. It is the through-line and organizing genre for the novel's tone, orientation and sensibility. A reader is not expected to 'find' or 'discover' a humorous moment within the reality of the text, rather, humor is the ongoing mood, like a comedy movie, rather than a movie that has some comedy or laughs within it.

The British academic and novelist David Lodge, in his book The Art of Fiction, identifies two basic sources of humor in the comic novel: situation (at the plot level) and style (at the textual level). According to him, "both depend crucially upon timing, that is to say, the order in which the words, and the information they carry, are arranged."

Pulitzer Prize-winning novelist Andrew Sean Greer wrote in a 2026 essay in The Guardian, "Nobody knows what a comic novel is. And once you start discussing it, all the fun runs out. E. B. White compared it to dissecting a frog (you're left with innards and a dead frog) but I would compare it to turning all the lights on at a party: everyone looks terrible and you've ruined the party."

== Notable authors of comic novels ==
=== British ===
One of the most notable British comic novelists is P. G. Wodehouse, whose work follows on from that of Jerome K. Jerome, George Grossmith, and Weedon Grossmith (see The Diary of a Nobody). Saki's work is also significant, although his career was cut short by World War I.

A. G. Macdonell and G. K. Chesterton also produced flights of whimsy related to the genre of comic novels.

Henry Fielding's The History of Tom Jones, a Foundling was a notable mid-18th century work in the genre.

Other contemporary British humorists include Roald Dahl, George MacDonald Fraser, Tom Sharpe, Kingsley Amis, Terry Pratchett, Richard Gordon, Rob Grant, Douglas Adams, Evelyn Waugh, Anthony Powell, Nick Hornby, Helen Fielding, Eric Sykes, Leslie Thomas, Stephen Fry, Richard Asplin, Mike Harding, Joseph Connolly, and Ben Elton.

=== Irish ===
James Joyce's Ulysses is considered by some to be a comic novel. However, it has literary goals beyond humor, or teaching through humor, with a deeper effort to channel authentic human thoughts and problems in the more traditional style. Critics have noted it is celebrated more for exploring people's inner lives, in a striking way at the time, than making readers laugh.

=== American ===
Notable American comic novelists include Mark Twain, Anita Loos, Richard Brautigan, Gore Vidal, Philip Roth, John Kennedy Toole, James Wilcox, John Swartzwelder, Larry Doyle, Jennifer Weiner, Carl Hiaasen, Louis Sachar, Joseph Heller, Peter De Vries, Thomas Pynchon, Kurt Vonnegut, Terry Southern, and Christopher Moore.

=== Persian ===
Iraj Pezeshkzad

== See also ==
- Comedy
- Fiction
