= William Asplin =

William Asplin (1686/7–1758) was a British writer, theologian, and churchman.

== Life ==
Asplin was educated at Trinity College, Oxford, and, on taking his B.A. degree in 1707, removed to St. Alban's Hall, and became vice-principal. He was ordained in 1709, became chaplain to a regiment, and in 1717 vicar of Banbury. In 1721 he became vicar of Horley, and in 1733 vicar of Burthorpe, Gloucestershire. He married Mary, daughter of John Myster, of Horton, Oxfordshire. Asplin was a man of considerable learning, and corresponded with Dr. John Ward, the Gresham Professor of Rhetoric, on matters relating to archaeological lore and natural history.

== Works ==
- Alkibla. A Disquisition upon Worshiping towards the East. Wherein are contain'd the General Antiquity, the Rise, and Reasonableness of this Religious Ceremony in the Gentile World: Its early Adoption into the Church of Christ; with a Free and Impartial Examination of the Reasons assigned for it by the Antient Fathers, By a Master of Arts of the University of Oxford. London, 1728.
- 1735, With a serious and impartial Examination of the Reasons assign'd for the Practice' of worshipping towards the east 'by our Modern Divines: in order to obviate Superstition in our Publick Devotion, to remove from it all Party-Distinction, and unnecessary Objections, and to assert the Principles of the Reformation; by reducing the Ceremonies of Churchmen to the Standard of the Church. To which are prefix'd, Some Thoughts by way of Preface concerning the proper Use of Ridicule in Controversies stil'd Religious. An answer was published by the Rev. John Andrews, vicar of South Newington, Oxfordshire, under the title of The Kebla: or, a Defence of Eastward Adoration, London, 2 parts, 1728-9; and this in turn was "dissected" in The Anatomy of the Kebla, by a true Son of the Church of England, 1729.
- The Impertinences of Modern Antiquaries display'd; or a Refutation of Mr. Wise's Letter to Dr. Mead concerning the "White Horse," London, no date. This pamphlet is considered to be probably by Asplin, and was answered in An answer to a scandalous libel intituled The impertinence and imposture of modern antiquaries displayed, also anonymous, by George North.
