= Bust of Mary Cathcart =

C. 1770 sculpture by Marie-Anne Collot

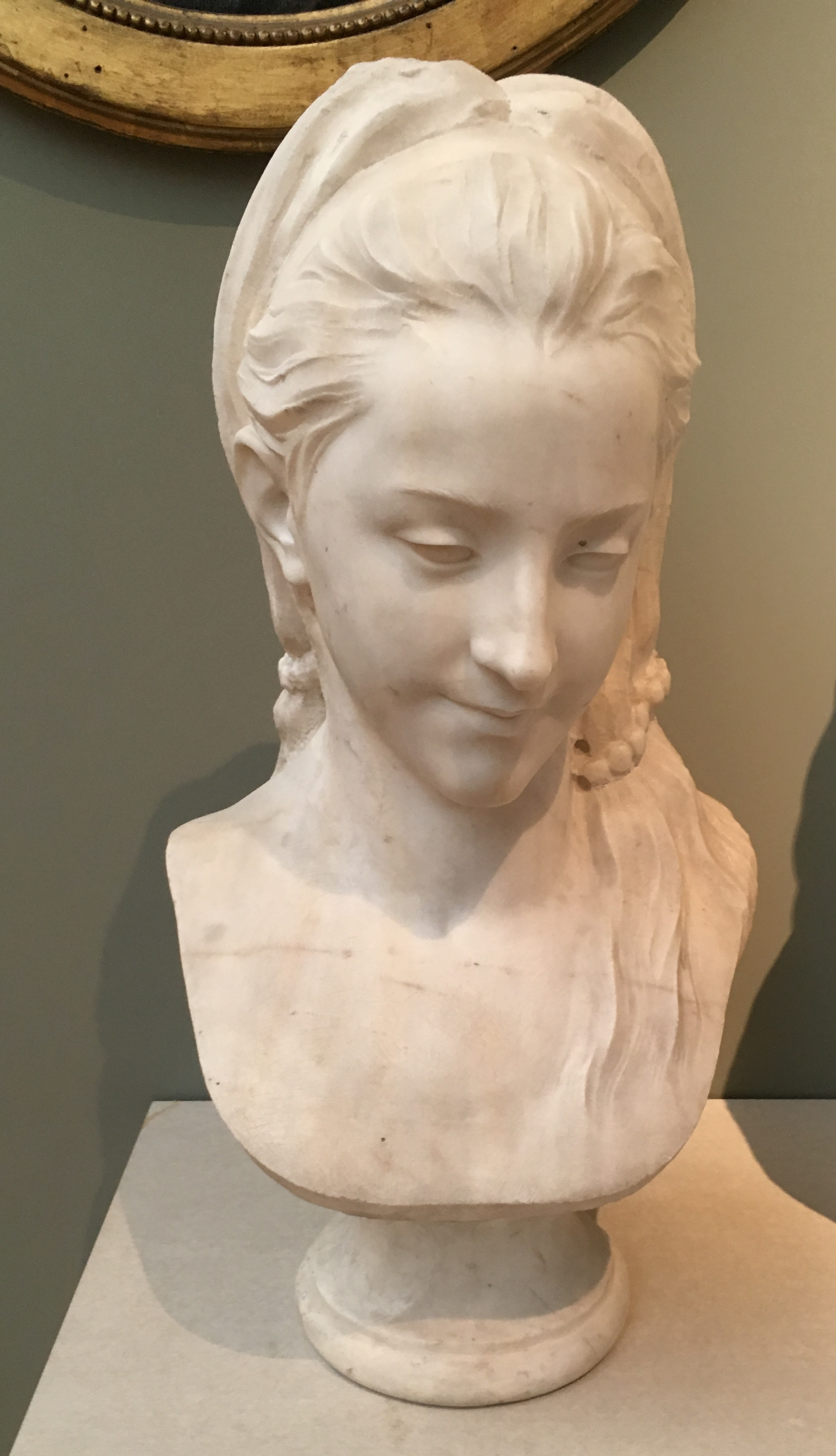

Bust of Mary Cathcart is a stone bust by Marie-Anne Collot, sculpted between 1768 and 1772. She produced several versions of it - the plaster original of 1768 is in the Louvre, a completed marble version is in the Russian Museum and an incomplete marble version in the Musée des Beaux-Arts de Nancy.

Its subject was a daughter of Charles Cathcart, 9th Lord Cathcart, British ambassador to the Russian Empire. He visited Collot's studio in March 1767 before leaving for St Petersburg in 1768 and continued to be in contact with the artist until summer 1772. Mary married Thomas Graham on 26 December 1774 and her daughter Lucy inherited the incomplete marble version, leaving it to the Musée des Beaux-Arts de Nancy in 1866.

== Bibliography (in French) ==
- Louis Réau, « Une femme sculptrice française au dix-huitième siècle, Marie-Anne Collot (Madame Falconet) », L'Art et les Artistes, February 1923, pp. 165-171.
- Louis Réau, « Une femme sculptrice française au XVIIIe siecle, Marie-Anne Collot (1748-1821) », Bulletin de la Société de l'Histoire de l'Art français, 1924, pp. 219-229.
- Louis Réau, «Les bustes de Marie-Anne Collot », La Renaissance, XIV, 1931, pp. 306-312.
- M.L. Becker, « Le buste de Diderot, de Collot à Houdon », L'Objet d'art, no. 412, April 2006.
