= Robert Fulke Greville (landowner) =

British businessman and politician (1800-1867)

Robert Fulke Greville (8 January 1800 – 12 September 1867) was a politician, soldier and landowner of the early Victorian era, the son of Regency courtier Robert Fulke Greville and Louisa, 2nd Countess of Mansfield.

Greville stood as a Parliamentary candidate for Pembrokeshire in the general election of 1831, but was defeated, and went to live abroad, embarking on a military career. Returning to Milford Haven in 1853, he took up residence in Castle Hall. He served as High Sheriff of Pembrokeshire for 1854.

He made great efforts to have the railway extended to the town of Milford Haven, which had been founded by his great-uncle Sir William Hamilton, and aided by his nephew, Charles Francis Greville (Robert's uncle). He constructed a pier and other facilities to encourage sea traffic with Ireland. He also constructed gasworks and waterworks, eventually running out of money for improvements and dying in debt.
