= David Murray, 2nd Earl of Mansfield =

British diplomat & politician (1727–1796)

The Right Honourable The Earl of Mansfield KT PC
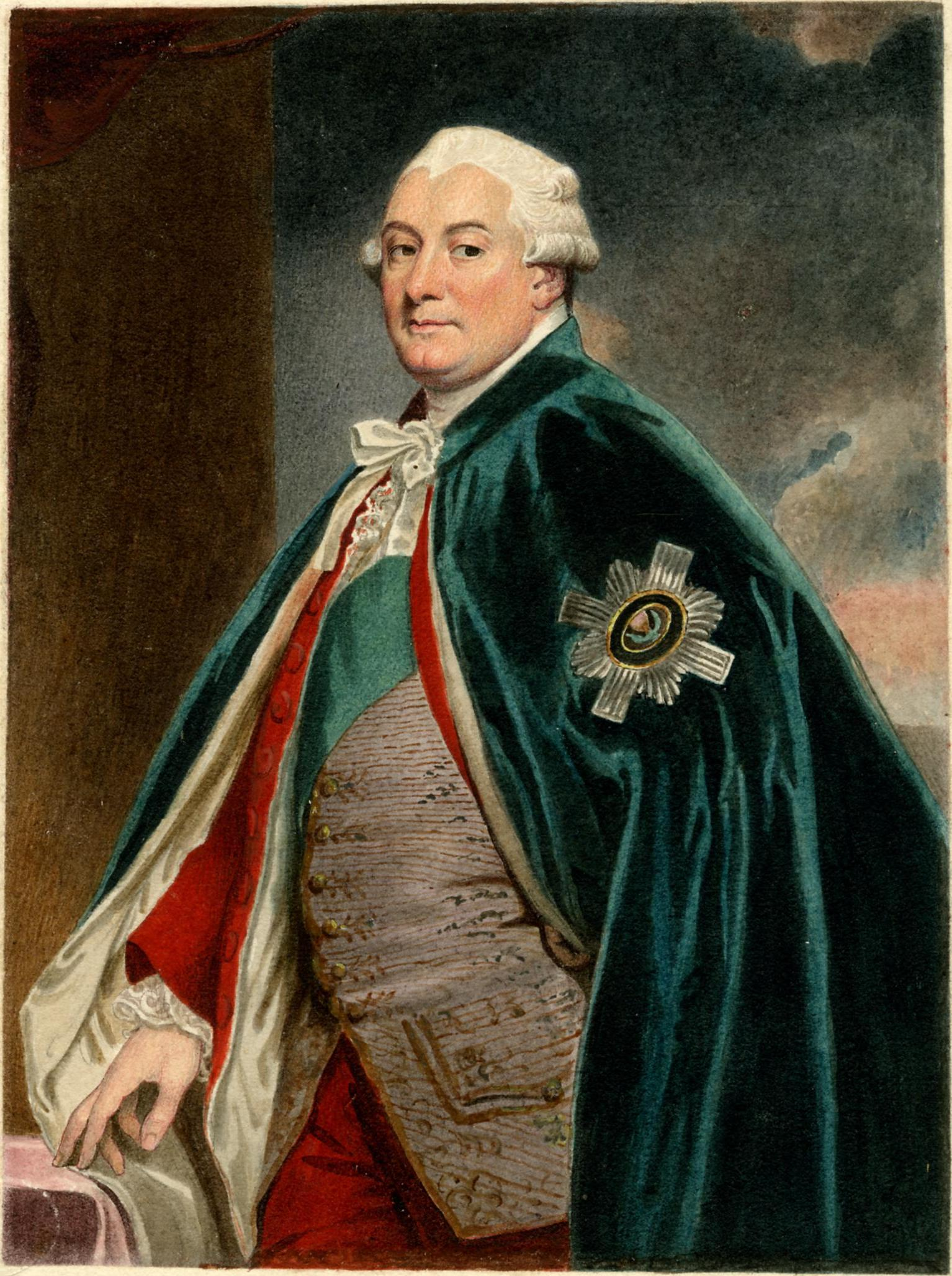

Lord President of the Council
- In office 17 December 1794 – 1 September 1796
- Monarch: George III
- Prime Minister: William Pitt
- Preceded by: The Earl Fitzwilliam
- Succeeded by: The Earl of Chatham
- In office 2 April 1783 – 19 December 1783
- Monarch: George III
- Prime Minister: The Duke of Portland
- Preceded by: The Lord Camden
- Succeeded by: The Earl Gower

Secretary of State for the Northern Department
- In office 27 October 1779 – 27 March 1782
- Monarch: George III
- Prime Minister: Lord North
- Preceded by: The Viscount Weymouth
- Succeeded by: Office abolished (The Earl of Shelburne as Home Secretary and Charles James Fox as Foreign Secretary)

Personal details
- Born: David Murray; 9 October 1727
- Died: 1 September 1796 (aged 68)
- Resting place: Westminster Abbey (body); Comlongon Castle (heart)
- Spouses: Countess Henrietta Frederica von Bünau (m. 1759; died 1766) Louisa Cathcart (m. 1776)
- Children: Lady Elizabeth Finch-Hatton; Henrietta Murray; David William Murray, 3rd Earl of Mansfield; George Murray; Charles Murray; Sir Henry Murray; Lady Caroline Murray
- Parents: David Murray, 6th Viscount of Stormont; Anne Stewart
- Relatives: William Murray, 1st Earl of Mansfield (paternal uncle)
- Education: Westminster School; Christ Church, Oxford
- Occupation: Politician

David Murray, 2nd Earl of Mansfield, 7th Viscount of Stormont, KT, PC (9 October 1727 – 1 September 1796) known as the Viscount of Stormont from 1748 to 1793, was a British diplomat and politician. He succeeded to both the Mansfield and Stormont lines of the Murray family, inheriting two titles and two fortunes.

== Background ==
Mansfield was the son of David Murray, 6th Viscount of Stormont, and his wife, Anne Stewart, heiress of John Stewart of Innernytie. The Lord Chief Justice, William Murray, 1st Earl of Mansfield, was his paternal uncle and mentor. Stormont inherited the family's estate and title of Viscount Stormont at 21 when his father died in 1748. The ancestral seat of the Viscounts Stormont is Scone Palace.

== Diplomat ==
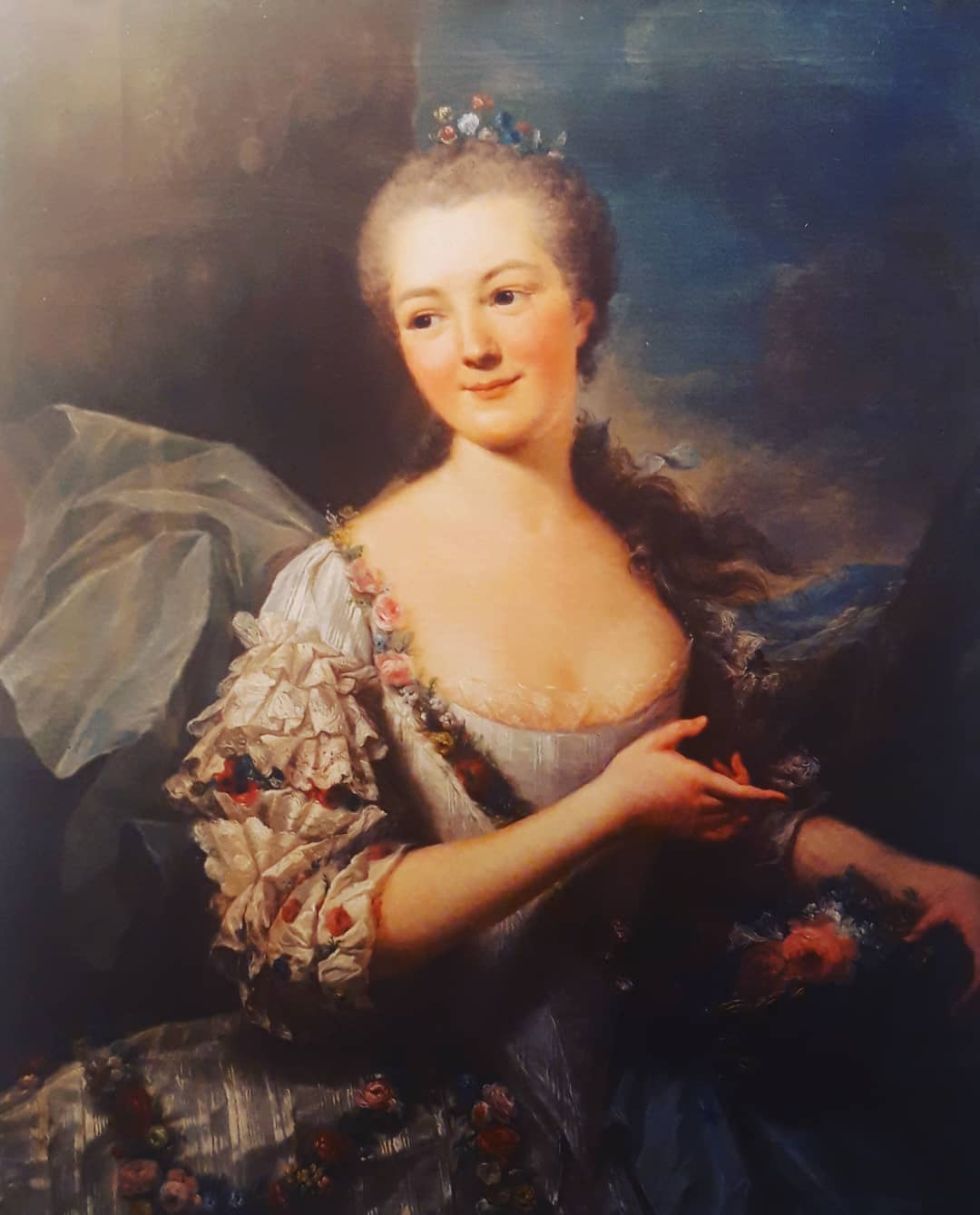
Countess Henrietta von Bünau by Marcello Bacciareli

Stormont's uncle was determined to advance his nephew and heir, so he carefully planned Stormont's education and occupation. He excelled in the study of the classics and languages especially Latin, so it was decided that he would become a diplomat.

Stormont became ambassador to Saxony-Poland, Austria and then to France with the help of his uncle, in the early years of the American War of Independence, he played a role in sending news of American actions back to England. He had been elected a Scottish representative peer in 1754. He also made a lifelong friend in William Cavendish-Bentinck, 3rd Duke of Portland, when he was sent to study under Stormont for a year in Warsaw, at the request of Stormont's uncle and the Duchess of Portland. The Duke was accompanied by Stormont's secretary, Benjamin Langlois.

When Frederick II of Prussia invaded Saxony, the Elector of Saxony was forced to retreat from Dresden to Warsaw, capital of his Polish kingdom. Stormont followed, he had previously met a German Imperial Countess (Reichsgrafin) in Dresden, her name was Henrietta Frederica von Bünau, daughter of Imperial Count Heinrich von Bünau. They fell in love and were married in Warsaw, Poland in 1759. Walpole wrote "Lord Stormont is actually married and is the happiest creature in the world, I would have him always so for his is the best."

His marriage was unexpected; instead of a calculated marriage with a British peerage like his uncle, he opted to marry for love to Countess Henrietta. Before her 2nd marriage, Henrietta was already a young and wealthy noble widow, her 1st husband having died young and bequeathed her all his fortune and three Danish estates. After marrying Stormont, she sold them in 1760. Stormont's uncle Lord Chief Justice encouraged the courtship, and even sent letters to Henrietta, future Countess of Mansfield welcoming her to the family.

=== Vienna ===
Stormont was appointed British Ambassador to Austria in 1763 at the court of Empress Maria Theresa. Stormont's wife, a German noblewoman by birth, facilitated his entry to Viennese high society, her more outgoing nature compensating for the reserved manner of her husband.

Described by Horace Walpole as 'such a Semele' due to her fragile health, Henrietta died suddenly in Vienna at the age of only 29 in 1766. Her death caused Stormont to have a nervous breakdown and he was given extended leave of absence. Such was his love for Henrietta that he embalmed her heart in a gold vase and carried it everywhere he went (later taken to Scone). Their sole surviving daughter Lady Elizabeth Murraywas eventually brought up by his uncle and his wife at Kenwood House.

Stormont described his wife as "Flourishing in the prime of life, in talent, in beauty, [and] remarkable for every praise, endowed with every virtue, she met a death happy to herself, [but] deeply bitter to her friends, parent and most wretched husband".

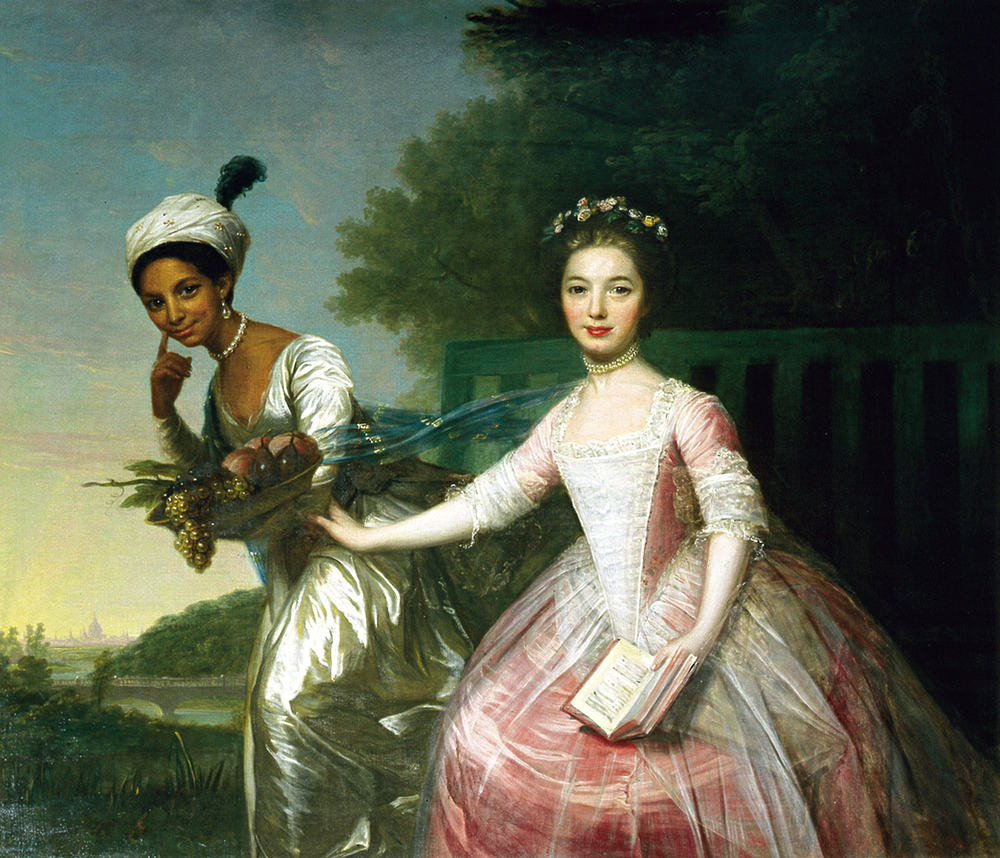
Dido Elizabeth Belle and Lady Elizabeth Murray by David Martin. Dido Elizabeth Belle (1761-1804) and Lady Elizabeth Murray (1760-1825), previously at Kenwood now at Scone Palace

His friend a fellow diplomat, Sir William Hamilton said to his niece Mary Hamilton, that if it wasn't for his help to get him out of his depression and recovered in Rome, he believed that Stormont might have gone mad, Hamilton said that the countess had a very elegant mind. Stormont didn't return to his post for two years and remained unmarried for a decade, despite the urgent need of providing an heir to keep both his and his uncle's titles from extinction.

The great antiquarian Johann Joachim Winckelmann (whom he met in Rome in 1768), had worked as librarian to Stormont's father in-law (Count von Bünau). He remarked that Stormont was "the most learned man of his rank whom I have yet known".

After his return from Rome, the final four years in Vienna were dominated by the Russo-Turkish War which began in 1768, He protested unofficially about the partitioning of Poland, but the partition was finalised in 1772.

Upon leaving Vienna, he was gifted a gold box set with diamonds by Joseph II, Holy Roman Emperor.

=== Paris ===
By now Stormont had become a leading British diplomat, this followed by ambassador to Paris from 1772 to March 1778. In France, he met Queen Marie Antoinette, whom he had acquainted back when she was a little archduchess in the court of her mother in Vienna years prior, The Queen of France was very pleased to be greeted by a friendly face and befriended the Viscount, it was said that he taught the young queen how to reels, to commemorate their friendship, she gifted him one of three Jean Henri Riesener writing desks previously commissioned to mark her marriage. Marie Antoinette nicknamed him "le bel Anglais" meaning the beautiful English.

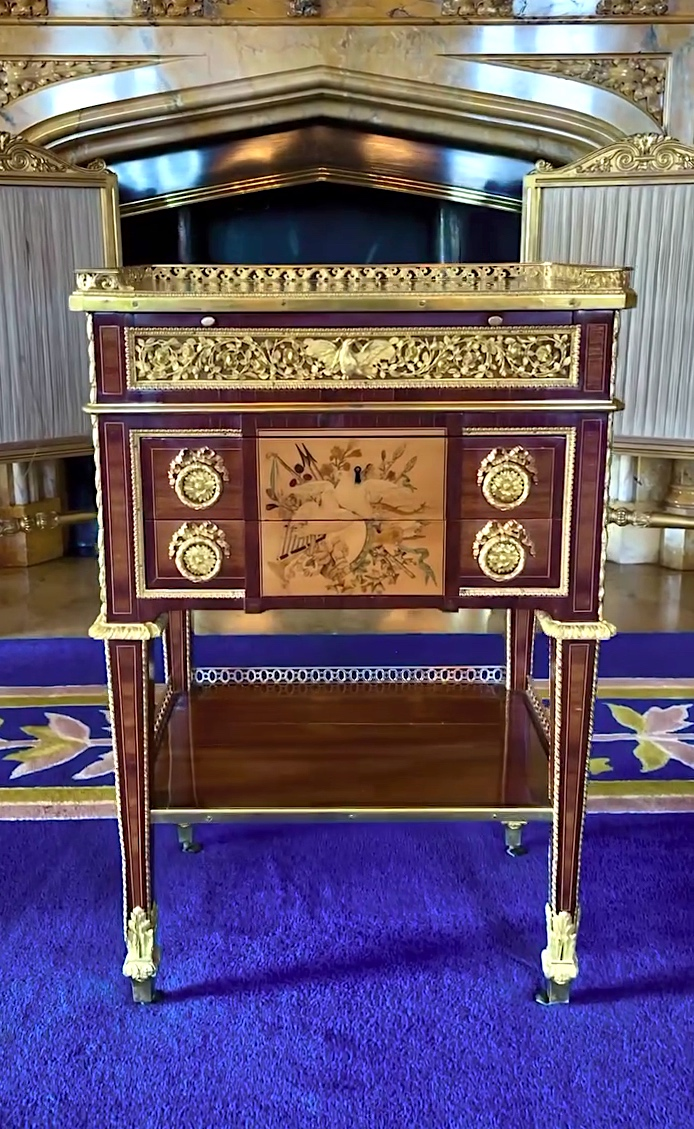
Queen Marie Antoinette writing desk by Riesener given to the 2nd earl (Scone Palace)

In 1774, when his uncle Lord Mansfield stayed at the French Embassy, Lord Stormont presented his uncle to Louis XVI and Marie Antionette at the Palace of Versailles. He was valued amongst French nobility for his intelligent brain, kind heart, and good looks, which he carried into middle age. He remarried after a decade to younger Louisa Cathcart in 1776.

When the French government secretly sent funds to America. The Americans built a frigate at Amsterdam, and another at Nantes. The French also contributed the means for supplying American privateers, that came into their ports. Every thing was done with as much discreet as possible; but Stormont, the British ambassador, had spies in all the principal ports, and was aware of all their proceedings.

Benjamin Franklin wrote to Stormont in April 1777 about exchanging prisoners, for which he didn't receive a satisfactory answer, later some prisoners were exchanged but the channel of exchanges wasn't always established.

In March 1778, France declared support for the American revolution and independence against Britain, at a ball in Versailles that Stormont attended. Hence, the ambassadors to both countries were recalled and Stormont returned to England. Madame du Deffand, lamented him as a friend and frequenter of her celebrated parties. ‘‘ I find wit in your Ambassador,” she wrote to Horace Walpole,“ The best of all our diplomatists without comparison. At last war is declared. Your Ambassador has received his recall, and perhaps leaves to-morrow. I wrote him one word. He promises to come and see me to-morrow between five and six. I own that I regret him, and have seen nothing in him that is not honest and reasonable ".

Jean-Baptiste Le Roy remarked on Benjamin Franklin, "Never have I seen a man as happy, as jubilant as was M. Franklin, the day that Lord Stormont, the English ambassador, finally left Paris".

== After diplomatic career ==
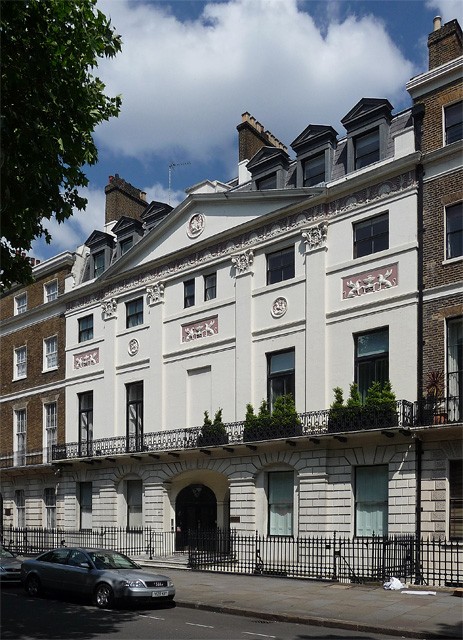
No. 37 Portland Place was destroyed during World War II, it had the same Adam façade as its twin No. 46-48 right across.

Stormont reached the apex of his career when he was appointed as the last Secretary of State for the Northern Department, serving from 1779 to 1782.

In 1783 he was appointed as Lord President of the Council, and again from 1794 to 1796. He served as Lord Justice General between 1778 and 1795. He was appointed a Privy Counsellor in 1763 and made a Knight of the Thistle in 1768.

He purchased 56 Portland Place (later renumbered to No.37) in 1778, the largest house in the street, recently developed by his friend Duke of Portland and Robert Adam.

King George III said that he had owed Stormont a great deal, but he never rewarded him, this was noted by his friend Mary Hamilton, who said word of a prince can't be held reliable, but a word of a King needed to be.For he had served King George III as envoy extraordinary for more than 20 years (his many letters to the King are held at The National Archives).

The 18th century hostess Elizabeth Montagu praised Stormont in 1779 saying "I was very sorry when he left us, for he used to call on me often, great sense, knowledge, & large acquaintance with the World make him very agreable, & I love him the better for his admirable answer to ye malicious attack on Lord Sandwich."

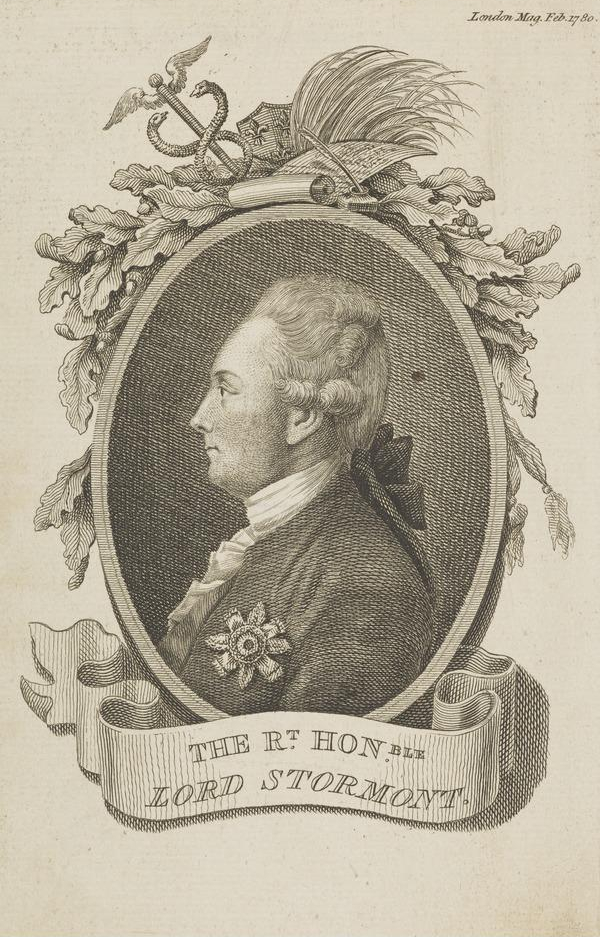
David Murray, Lord Stormont c.1780.

=== Gordon Riots ===
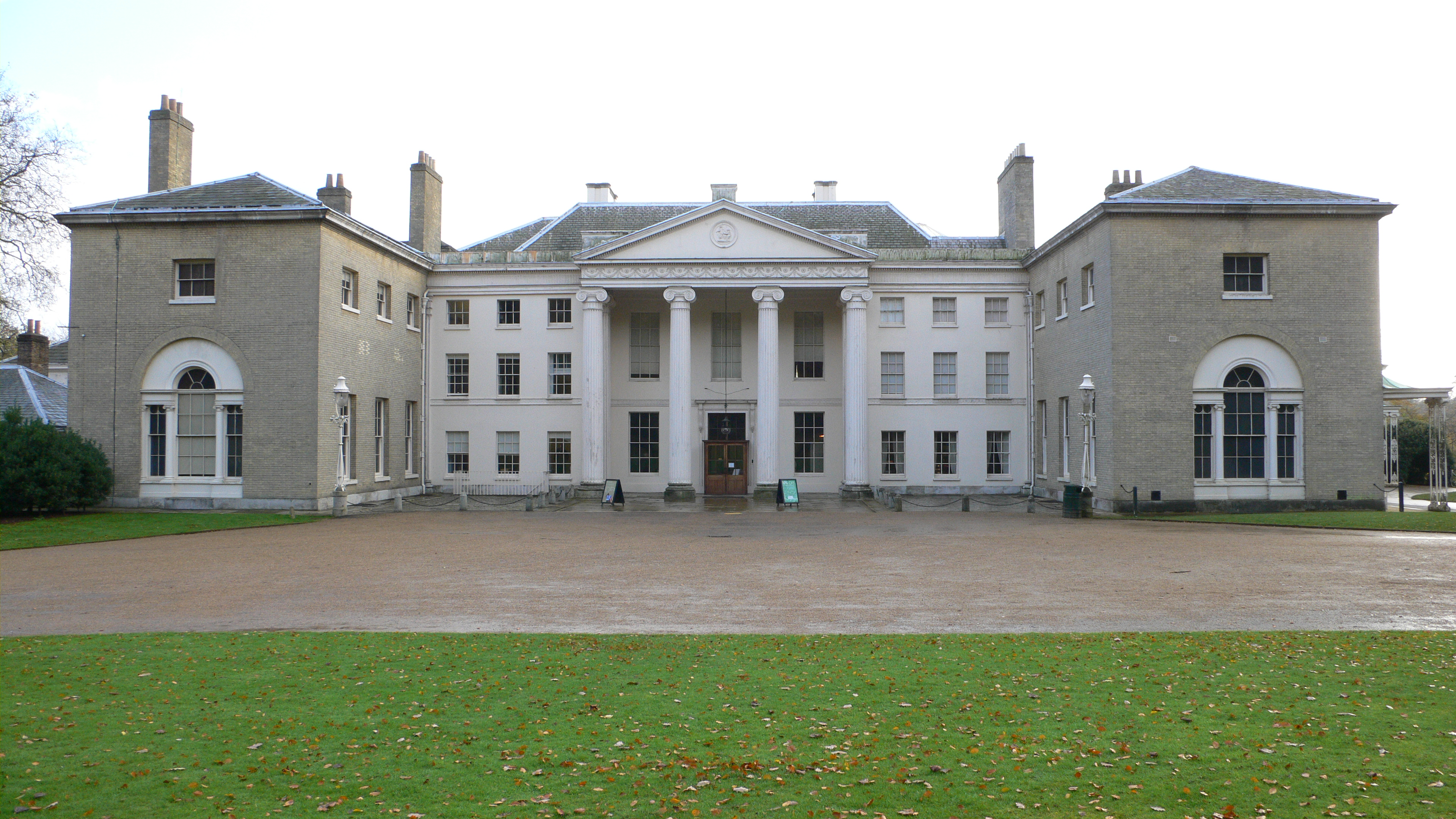
Kenwood House with the new wings to the left and right added by the 2nd Earl (North facade)

During the Gordon riots of 1780, his uncle Lord Mansfield's Bloomsbury Square townhouse was burned to the ground. It was reported that Lord Mansfield, Lady Mansfield and his daughter Lady Elizabeth had escaped using the back door. Lady Mansfield's clothes were burned alongside Lord Mansfield's precious book collection.

But it was rumored that sixty angry mobs also targeted Kenwood House next, given its close proximity to London. Stormont wrote to King George III that he had ordered light cavalry to be dispatched to Kenwood. The rioters approached Kenwood with hostile intentions, but were stalled by free ale from the nearby Spaniard’s Inn, assisted by Lord Mansfield’s steward using wine supply from the house, they successfully stalled the mob until the armed forces arrived to protect the house.

He knew not only that Kenwood House would one day be his, but also his own daughter and sisters were in dire danger, as they still remained at Kenwood. Stormont successfully saved Kenwood, his uncle beloved home from burning and looting.

=== The Great Stormont Breakfast ===
In 1783, Stormont, in compliment to French visitors, prepared an elegant event at his estate on Wandsworth Hill, above 600 admission cards were issued, 16 tents were pitched in the park. The guests assembled around 11, then the Prince of Wales arrived at two. The Duke of Chartres came with the prince, alongside the rest of foreign nobilities with the ambassadors. Amongst the guests were Duke of Fitz-James, 3rd Duke of Dorset, 4th Duke of Malborough, 4th Duke of Queensbery, Lord Cathcart, 9th Earl of Winchilsea, 5th Earl of Carlisle, Duchess of Buccleuch, Duchess of Bedford, Countess Howe, Viscountess Beauchamp.

=== Second Earl of Mansfield ===
In 1793 he succeeded his uncle, William, 1st Earl of Mansfield who had died. Stormont became the 2nd Earl of Mansfield of the 1792 creation, while his wife succeeded as 2nd Countess of Mansfield of the 1776 creation, according to special remainders in the letters patent. He inherited his uncle's Kenwood House in the London Borough of Camden and his entire wealth.

In March 1794, King George III visited Kenwood House, Queen Charlotte wrote in her diary that his majesty took his airing walk and was curious about the new architectural addition to Kenwood by his friend, the 2nd Earl of Mansfield.

=== Death ===
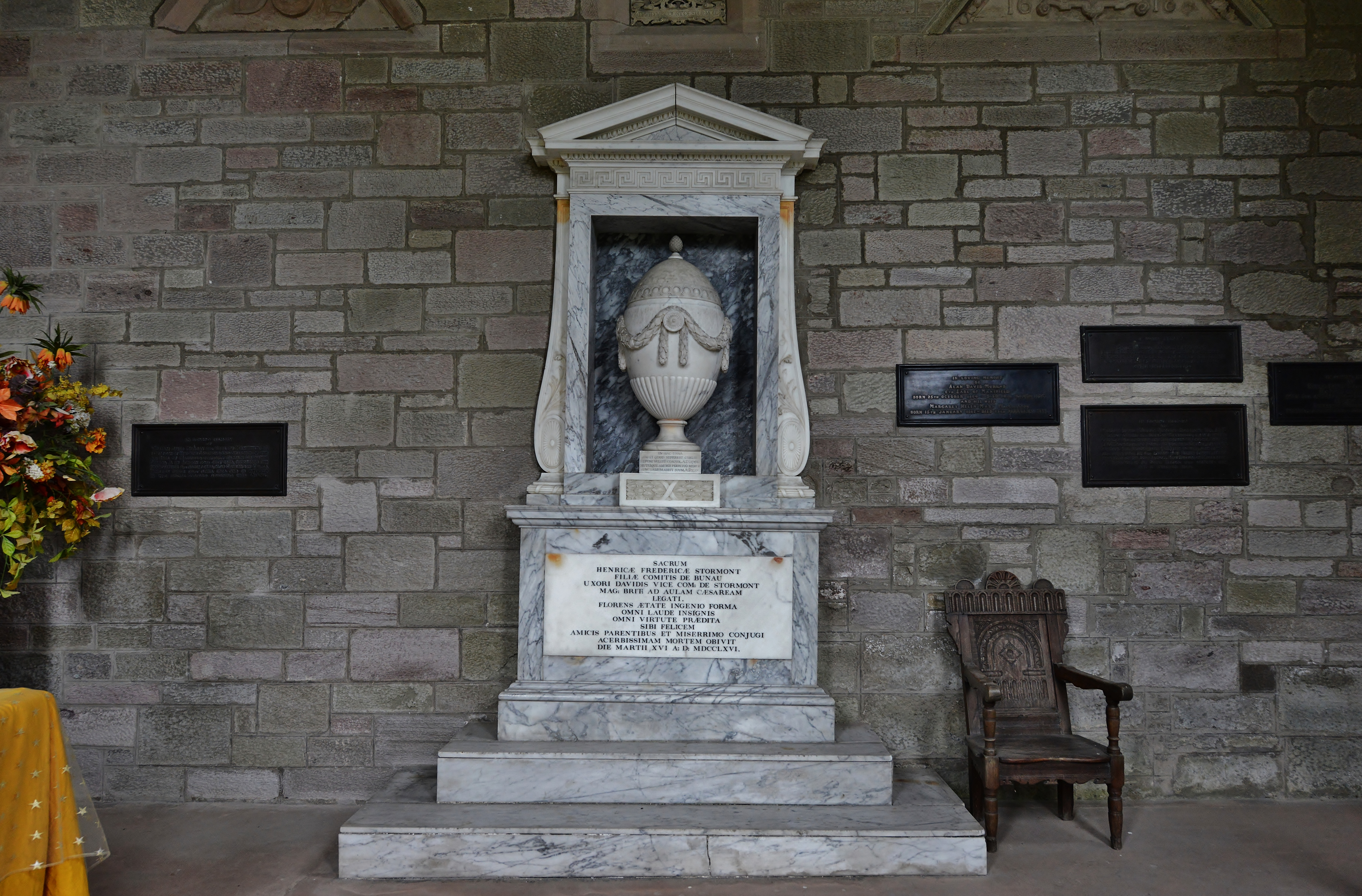
Countess Henrietta and Lord Stormont's memorial at Scone Palace. (the inscription was added right at the small base below the vase)

Lord Mansfield died in September 1796 at Brighton. In his will he had requested a simple burial wherever he died and his heart removed and taken to Scone Palace to be reunited with that of his first wife, he also requested adding latin inscriptions of "Mutuique amoris perpetuo memor, Nunc demum addit suum" meaning "Remembering each other's love forever and now, at last, he adds his own" to their memorial at Scone Palace.

But, instead his body was laid to rest with his uncle, the 1st Earl, at Westminster Abbey with a lot of processions fit for such prominent figure. His heart was interred in Comlongon Castle. He left his eldest daughter, three paintings of her mother Henrietta that still hung in his dressing room and left all his younger children equal inheritances.

He was succeeded in his titles by his eldest son David William Murray. His second son, the Honourable George Murray, became a Lieutenant-General in the Army. His fourth son, the Honourable Sir Henry Murray, rose to the rank of General.

His sister, Lady Margery said in her will, "I leave amber snuff box set in gold as a token of my love and esteem for the kindest and best of brothers he will value it as having once belonged to his worthy friend." From Lord Stormont's obituary in Gentleman's Magazine:

No man ever fulfilled all the relative duties of social life with more scrupulous exactness, either as a father, a husband, a brother, or a friend. His liberality was unbounded, not ostentatious indeed, but secret in the manner, and princely in the measure, as the writer of this, who knew him long and well, can vouch; not only as having been, on a very important occasion of his life, the object of it, but also as one of the channels through which it flowed, to the amount of many thousand pounds.

The Countess of Mansfield survived her husband by 47 years. She went on to remarry to her first cousin the Hon. Robert Fulke Greville in 1797. Lady Mansfield died in July 1843, aged 85.

== Family ==
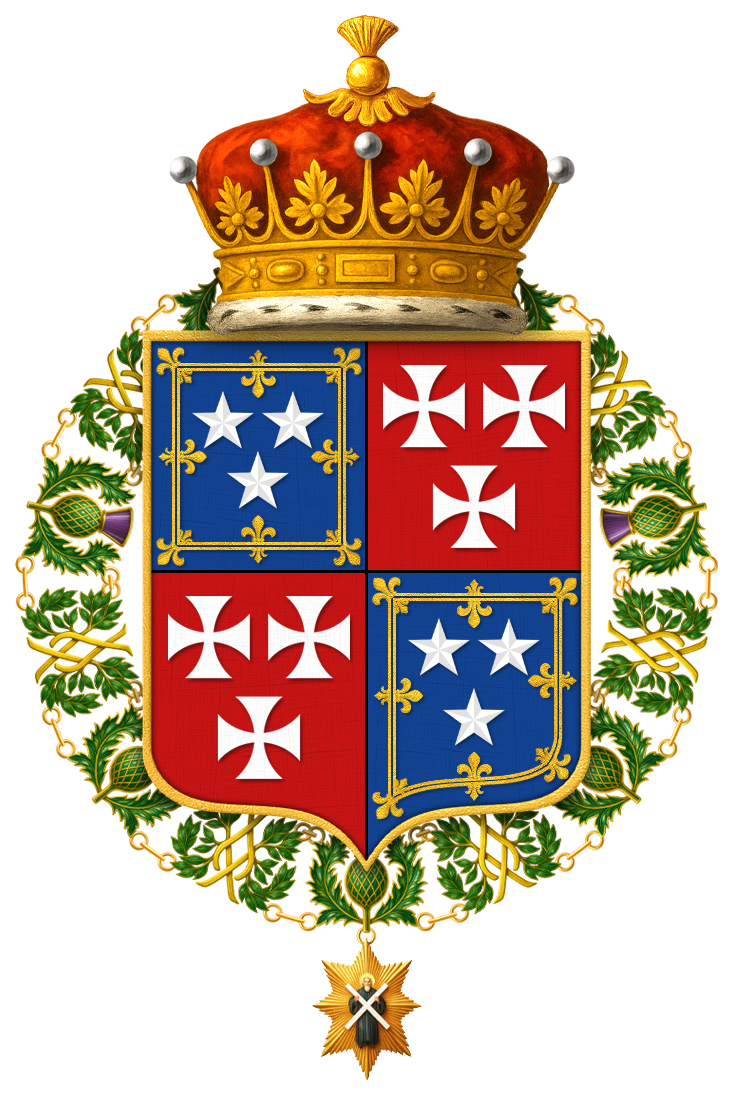
Shield of arms of David Murray, 2nd Earl of Mansfield, KT, PC, encircled with the collar of the Order of the Thistle

Lord Stormont, as he was known at the time, married his wife on 16 August 1759, whilst he was British ambassador to Saxony. She was Countess Henrietta Frederica von Bünau daughter of Count Heinrich von Bünau. They had two daughters:

- Lady Elizabeth Murray (18 May 1760 – 1 June 1825); married George Finch-Hatton of Eastwell in 1785 and had issue, including George William Finch-Hatton, 10th Earl of Winchilsea.
- Hon. Henrietta Anne Murray (16 October 1764, Dresden – circa 1765, Vienna)

Henrietta died on 10 March 1766 in Vienna. A decade later, on 5 May 1776, Stormont married secondly The Hon. Louisa Cathcart (1 June 1758 – 11 July 1843), daughter of Charles Cathcart, 9th Lord Cathcart and Jane Hamilton. Louisa was his junior by 30 years, she was also the niece of Sir William Hamilton, and they had five children:

- David William Murray, 3rd Earl of Mansfield (1777–1840) had issue William Murray, 4th Earl of Mansfield.
- Lieutenant-general The Hon. George Murray (1780–1848)
- Major The Hon. Charles Murray (1781–1859), who married Elizabeth Law and had children
- General Sir Henry Murray (1784–1860), who married Emily, daughter of Gerard de Vismé, and had children.
- Lady Caroline Murray (1789-1867), unmarried.

His second wife once said that she had never seen a good portrait of her husband, "the drawing of me, which had many faults, you shall have a resemblance of me in some shape or the other, but as for Lord Stormont I shall not consent, for I never saw a good likeness of him".

== Representation in media ==
- Peter Hudson played Lord Stormont in BBC TV series Marie Antoinette (2022).
- John Hollingworth portrayed Lord Stormont in Apple TV+ miniseries Franklin (2024).

== See also ==
- William Eden, 1st Baron Auckland
- Jean-Charles-Pierre Lenoir

Diplomatic posts
Preceded by Charles Hanbury Williams	British Minister to Saxony; 1755–1764	Succeeded by Philip Stanhope
Preceded by Simon Harcourt, 1st Earl Harcourt	British Ambassador to France; 1772–1778	Vacant American Revolutionary War Title next held by Thomas Grenville in 1782
Legal offices
Preceded by Charles Douglas, 3rd Duke of Queensberry	Lord Justice General; 1778–1795	Succeeded by James Graham, 3rd Duke of Montrose
Political offices
Preceded by Thomas Thynne, 1st Marquess of Bath	Secretary of State for the Northern Department; 1779–1782	Office abolished
Preceded by Thomas Thynne, 1st Marquess of Bath	Leader of the House of Lords; 1779–1782	Succeeded by William Petty, 2nd Earl of Shelburne
Preceded by Charles Pratt, 1st Earl Camden	Lord President of the Council; 1783	Succeeded by Granville Leveson-Gower, 2nd Earl Gower
Preceded by William Wentworth-Fitzwilliam, 2nd Earl Fitzwilliam	Lord President of the Council; 1794–1796	Succeeded by John Pitt, 2nd Earl of Chatham
Peerage of Great Britain
Preceded by William Murray	Earl of Mansfield; 2nd creation 1793–1796	Succeeded by David William Murray
Peerage of Scotland
Preceded by David Murray	Viscount Stormont; 1748–1796	Succeeded by David William Murray
