= Absolom motorcycles =

- Company type: Privately held company
- Industry: Motorcycle
- Founder: J Absolom
- Headquarters: Launceston, Tasmania, Australia
- Products: Motorcycles

J Absolom of 88 Brisbane Street, Launceston, Tasmania, sold at least one motorcycle under his own name around 1915.
