= Richard Asplin =

English novelist

Richard Asplin (born 28 November 1972 in London, England) is an English novelist working in the crime and comic novel genres.

His first novel; T-Shirt and Genes was published by Arrow Books, an imprint of Random House in 2001. A romantic comedy addressing the perils of applying evolutionary psychology to modern relationships. It was praised by Tony Parsons as being “the funniest debut novel since The Rachel Papers”. T-Shirt and Genes was followed by Gagged (a thriller with jokes) in 2004 which is also published by Arrow Books.

In 2009 Asplin's third novel, Conman, was published by UK independent crime specialist No Exit Press. The book was shortlisted for the 2010 Gold Dagger award by the Crime Writers' Association.

As well as writing, Asplin has performed as a musician, stand-up comedian and worked in marketing. He is married and lives in London.
