= Absolom (name) =

Absolom is both a surname and a given name. Notable people with the name include:

- Charlie Absolom (1846–1889), English cricketer
- Joe Absolom (born 1978), English actor
- Ted Absolom (1875–1927), Australian rules footballer
- Absolom Gant (1832–1897), American politician from Texas
- Absolom M. West (1818–1894), American militia general and politician
- Absolom of Caesarea, one of the Martyrs of Caesarea (also known as Absalom, Absalon, and Absolucius)
- Absolem, a fictional caterpillar character from Alice in Wonderland (2010 film)

== See also ==
- Absolom (disambiguation)
