= Rogers Ruding =

English cleric and academic

Rogers Ruding (1751–1820) was an English cleric and academic, known as a numismatist and the author of the Annals of the Coinage. He was the Vicar of Malden, Surrey from 1793 until his death in 1820. Prior to his marriage in May 1793, he was the Reverend Clerk at St George's, Bloomsbury, in London.

== Life ==
He was second son of Rogers Ruding of Westcotes, Leicestershire, by Anne, daughter of James Skrymsher, born at Leicester on 9 August 1751. Matriculating at Merton College, Oxford, on 21 June 1768, he graduated B.A. in 1772, proceeded M.A. in 1775 and B.D. in 1782.

Ruding was elected fellow of his college in 1775. He was presented to the college living of Malden, Surrey, in 1793, and became fellow of the Society of Antiquaries of London and an honorary member of the Philosophical Society at Newcastle-on-Tyne. He died at Malden, on 16 February 1820.

== Works ==
Ruding was influenced in the direction of numismatics by Richard Southgate. He published:

- A Proposal for restoring the Antient Constitution of the Mint, so far as relates to the Expense of Coinage, together with a Plan for the Improvement of Money, and for increasing the Difficulties of Counterfeiting, 1798.
- "Some Account of the Trial of the Pix" (Archæologia, xvii. 164.)
- "Memoir of the Office of Cuneator" (Archæologia xviii. 207).
- The Annals of the Coinage of Britain and its Dependencies, 3 vols., London, 1817–19; 2nd edition. enlarged and continued to the close of 1818, 5 vols., London, 1819; vol. vi., plates, 1819; 3rd edit., enlarged and indexed 3 vols., London, 1840. For the first edition, which was sold out in six months, the Society of Antiquaries permitted Martin Folkes's plates to be used. The third edition was edited by John Yonge Akerman, with others.

Ruding also contributed articles on the coinage to the Gentleman's Magazine.

== Family ==
Rogers, at the time Reverend & Clerk of St George Bloomsbury, Middlesex, bachelor, was married on 16 May 1793 in the Parish of St George, Bloomsbury to his first cousin Charlotte Ruding, spinster (1761-1854), fourth daughter of his uncle John Ruding and wife Jane Evans.

Rogers and Charlotte had issue: three sons, none of whom survived him (Skrymsher Rogers Ruding (1796-1816), Clifton Skyrmsher Ruding (1801-1804), John Skrymsher Ruding (1802-1802)and two daughters, Charlotte Skrymsher Ruding (1795-1874) married 1822 to Julius Charles Xavier Aubriet, and Harriet Skrymsher Ruding (1805-1855) married in 1843 to cousin John Ruding Stephens (John's mother Maria Ruding was the daughter of Walter Ruding, Rogers' elder brother).

Rogers' wife (and cousin) Charlotte had among her siblings, John Clement Ruding (1753-1829) a Corn Factor (merchant) who married a Martha Davis. John and Martha had among their children, Rogers Ruding, Merchant (1795-1856) and John Clement Ruding Jnr. The latter never married and was the sole executor of his brother Rogers' will in 1856.

Rogers Ruding, Merchant, was married in 1816 Epsom, Surrey to Emma Whiting. The marriage was performed by Rogers in his capacity as Vicar of Malden, the two men being 1st cousins once removed. The couple Rogers Ruding and Emma had among their children, Ellen Ruding (1819-1854) who married Thomas Havers (~1810-1870) who were the parents of artist Alice Mary Havers (1850-1890) and author Dorothy Henrietta Boulger.

== Notes / references ==
Attribution

This article incorporates text from a publication now in the public domain: Lee, Sidney, ed. (1897). "Ruding, Rogers". Dictionary of National Biography. Vol. 49. London: Smith, Elder & Co.
