= Charles Cathcart, 9th Lord Cathcart =

British Army officer and diplomat

Lieutenant-General The Right Honourable The Lord Cathcart KT
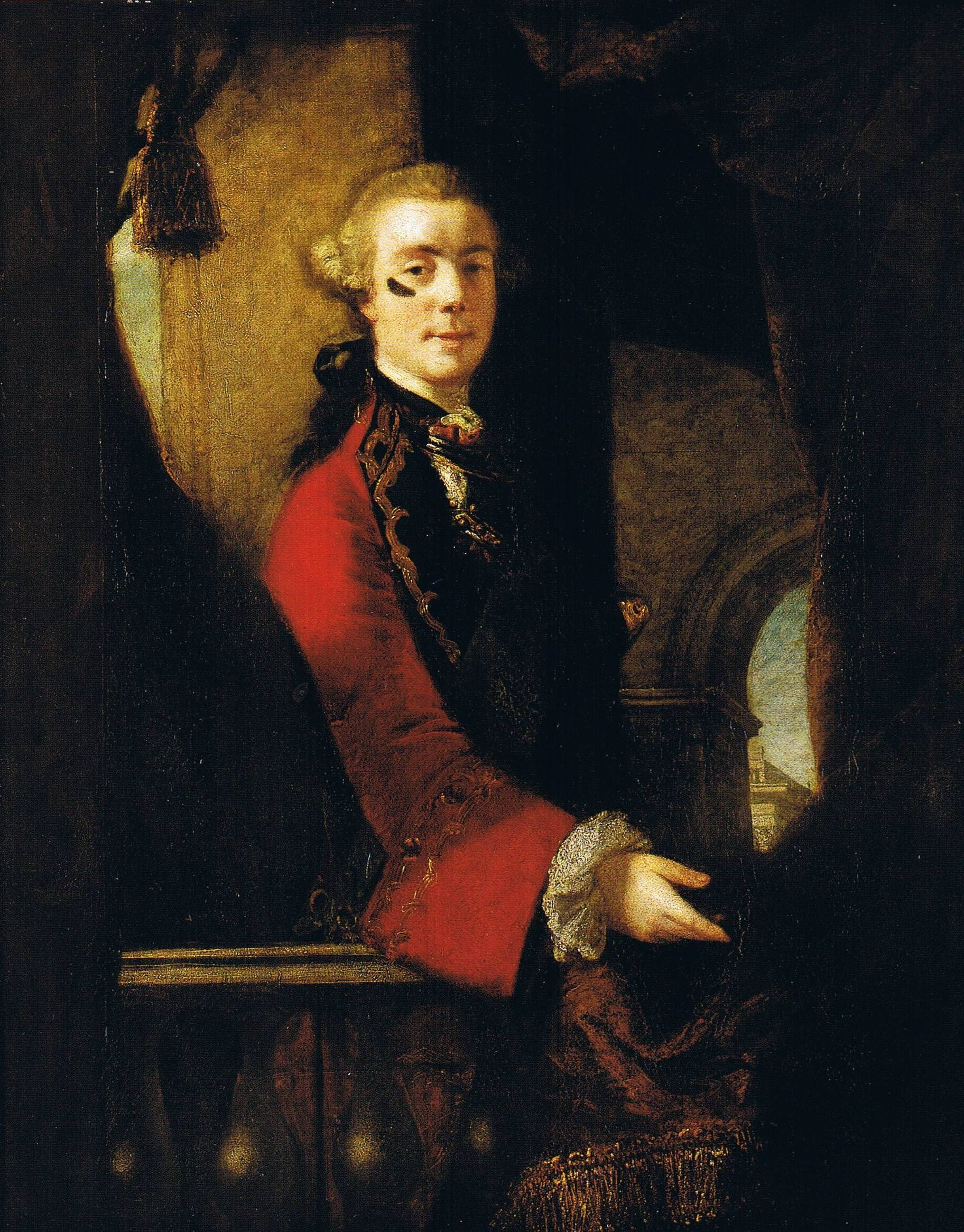
- Portrait by Sir Joshua Reynolds, 1753–1755

Ambassador from Great Britain to Russia
- In office February 1768 – 1772
- Preceded by: George Macartney, 1st Earl Macartney
- Succeeded by: Sir Robert Gunning, 1st Baronet

Personal details
- Born: 21 March 1721
- Died: 14 August 1776 (aged 55)
- Citizenship: British
- Spouse: Jane Hamilton
- Occupation: Diplomat, soldier
- Nickname: Patch Cathcart

Military service
- Allegiance: Kingdom of Great Britain
- Branch/service: British Army
- Battles/wars: War of the Austrian Succession: Battle of Fontenoy; Jacobite Rising of 1745: Battle of Culloden

Lieutenant-General Charles Schaw Cathcart, 9th Lord Cathcart, KT (21 March 1721 – 14 August 1776) was a British Army officer and diplomat. He was also chief of the Clan Cathcart.

== Biography ==
The son of Charles Cathcart, 8th Lord Cathcart, and Marion Shaw, he was born on 21 March 1721. Opposed to the restoration of the Stuart monarchy, he became an aide-de-camp to the Duke of Cumberland and during the Battle of Fontenoy in 1745, was shot in the face. Joshua Reynolds' portrait (1753–55) shows the black silk patch he used to cover the scar on his cheek. This seemingly earned him the soubriquet 'Patch Cathcart'. The following year at the Battle of Culloden, again acting as ADC to Cumberland, Cathcart was once more wounded in battle.

Charles was the last Lord Cathcart to inherit the family estate of Sundrum. Upon inheriting his mother's estates in Greenock he sold Sundrum to James Murray of Broughton in 1758. Through his mother he also inherited Schawpark near Sauchie at Gartmorn. The house dated from 1700. A small group of cottages on the estate were involved in the "manufacture of osnaburgs when visited by Bishop Richard Pococke in 1760.

In 1763 he was created a Knight of the Order of the Thistle.

In August 1768 he arrived as the ambassador at St Petersburg and was he was well received by Catherine the Great. He served, poorly, at the Russian court until 1772. On his return to Britain he was elected Rector of Glasgow University in 1773.

In 1775 he commissioned Robert Adam to remodel Schawpark, but he did not live to see completion of the works.

He died on 14 August 1776.

== Personal life and children ==
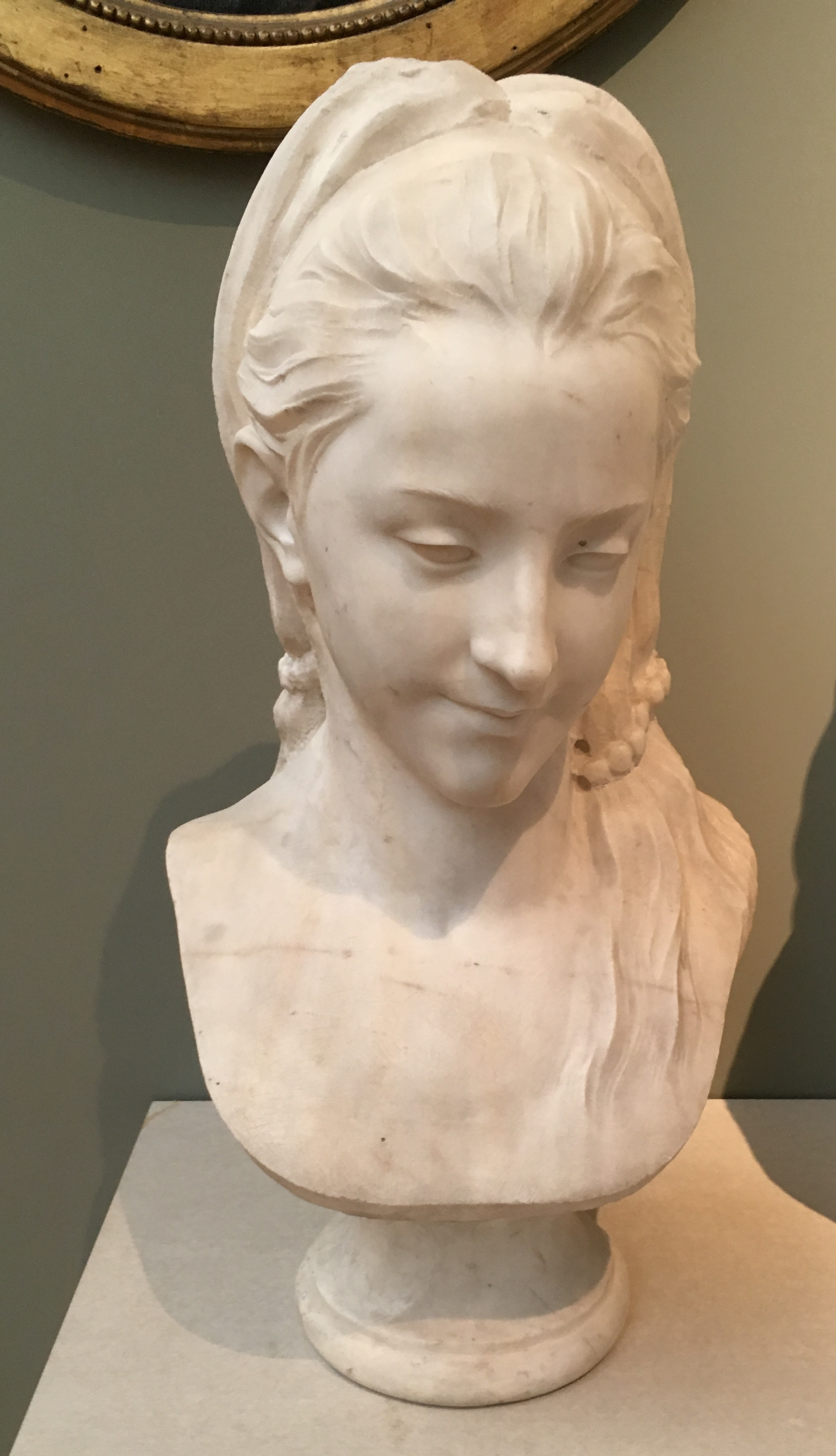
Bust of his daughter Mary.

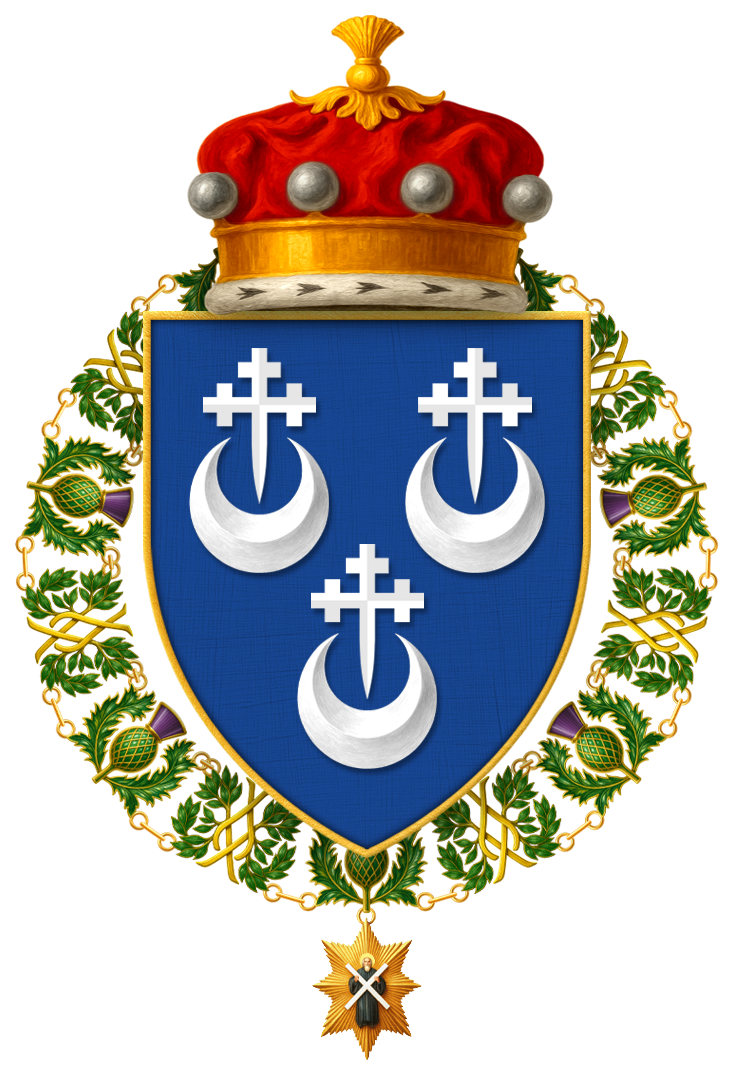
Shield of arms of Charles Schaw Cathcart, 9th Lord Cathcart, KT, encircled with the collar of the Order of the Thistle

On 24 July 1753 he married Jean Hamilton (1722–1771), daughter of Captain Lord Archibald Hamilton and Lady Jane Hamilton. They had nine children:

1. Jane (20 May 1754 – 5 December 1790), the first wife of John Murray, 4th Duke of Atholl, he was her second cousin once removed through the Hamilton.
2. William Cathcart, 1st Earl Cathcart (17 September 1755 – 16 June 1843)
3. Mary Cathcart (1 March 1757 – 26 June 1792), a celebrated beauty, who married Thomas Graham, 1st Baron Lynedoch
4. Louisa (1 June 1758 – 11 July 1843), married first, David Murray, 2nd Earl of Mansfield (1727–1796); married second, The Hon. Robert Fulke Greville
5. Charles (28 December 1759 – 10 June 1788)
6. John (23 April 1761 – 00 January 1762)
7. Archibald (25 July 1764 – 10 October 1841)
8. [a son] (7 June 1768; stillborn)
9. Catherine Charlotte (8 July 1770 – 20 October 1794), died unmarried
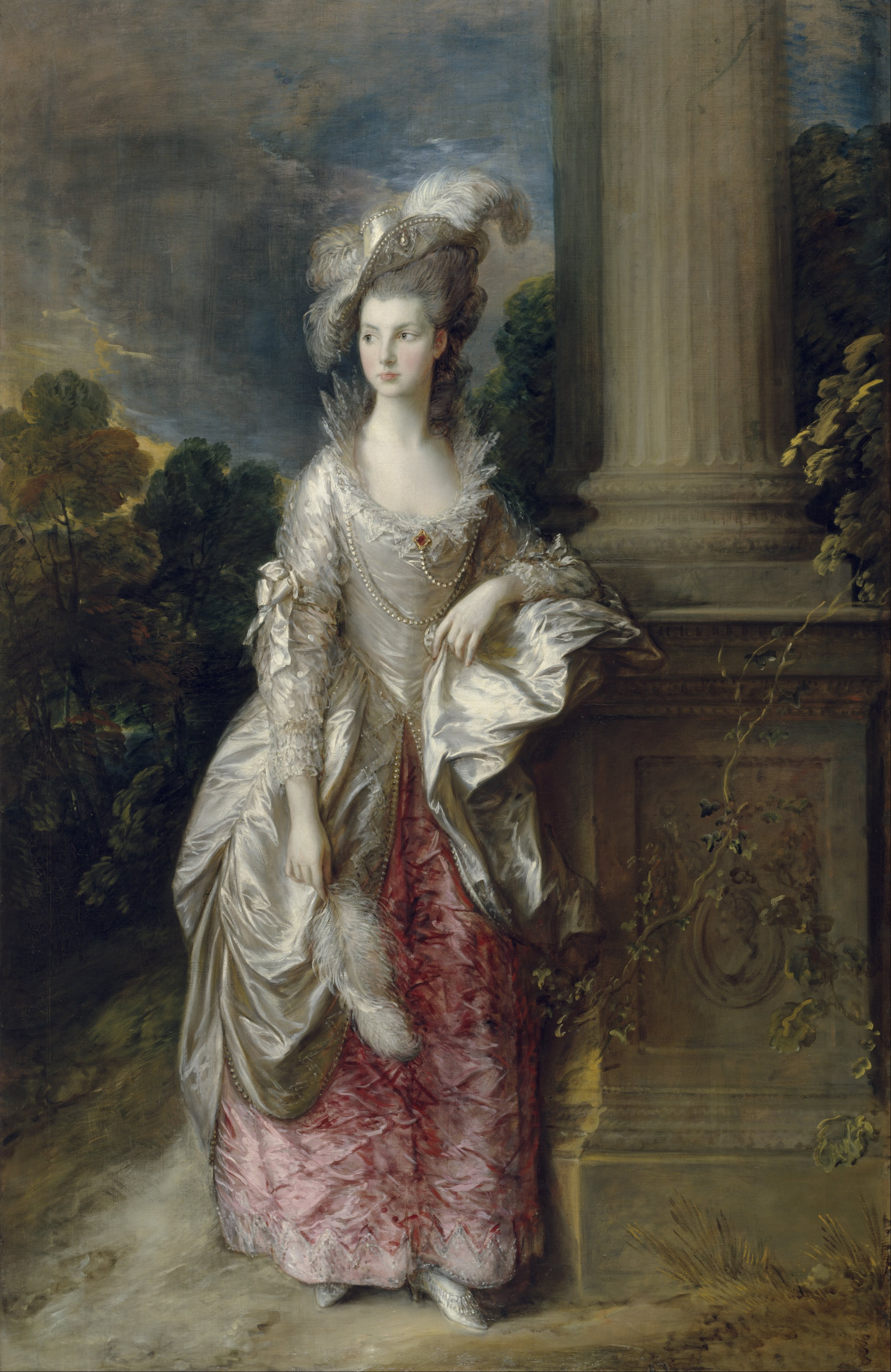
  Thomas Gainsborough - The Honourable Mrs Graham (1757 - 1792), 1777.

== Ranks ==
He held the following ranks:

- Captain, 1742
- Colonel, 1750
- Major-General, 1758
- Lieutenant-General, 1760

Diplomatic posts
Preceded by Sir George Macartney	Ambassador from Great Britain to Russia; 1768–1772	Succeeded by Sir Robert Gunning
Academic offices
Preceded by Lord Frederick Campbell	Rector of the University of Glasgow; 1773–1775	Succeeded by Sir James Montgomery
Peerage of Scotland
Preceded by Charles Cathcart	Lord Cathcart; 1740–1776	Succeeded by William Cathcart
