= Robert Fulke Greville =

British politician

Lieutenant-Colonel The Honourable Robert Fulke Greville FRS
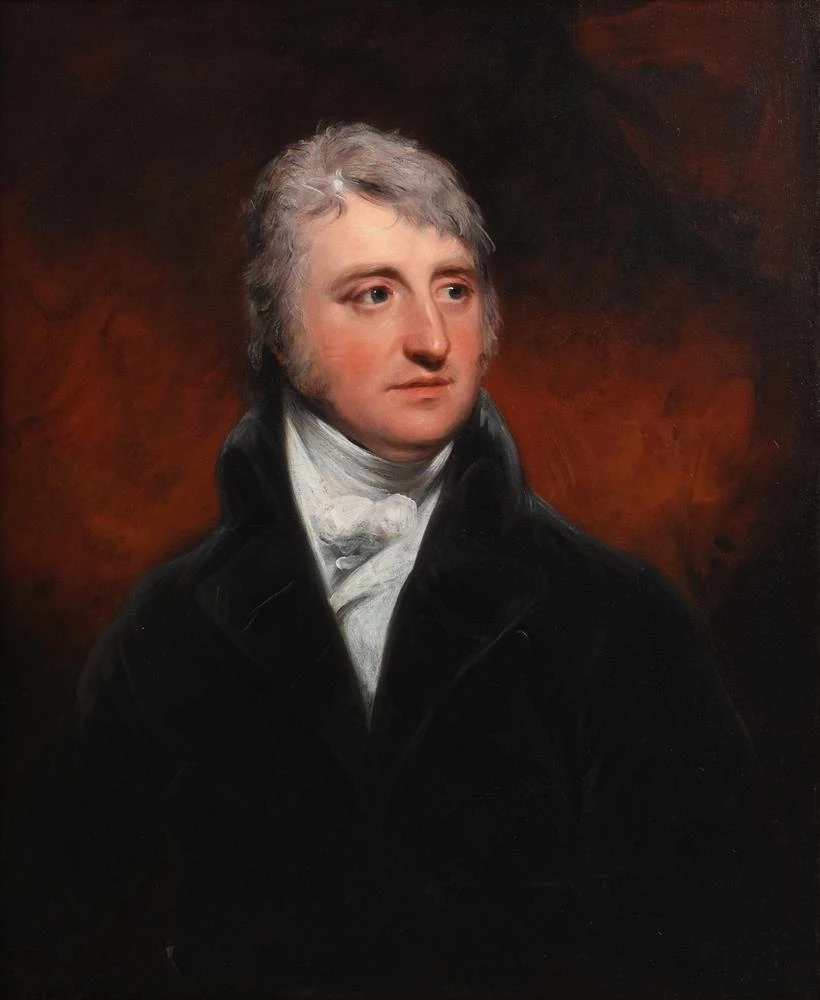
- The Hon. Robert Fulke Greville 1800

Member of the Great Britain Parliament for Warwick
- In office 1774–1780

Member of Parliament for New Windsor
- In office 1796–1800

Member of Parliament for New Windsor
- In office 1801–1806

Personal details
- Born: 3 February 1751
- Died: 27 April 1824 (aged 73)
- Spouse: Louisa Murray, 2nd Countess of Mansfield (m. 1797)
- Children: Georgiana, Lady Cathcart; Lady Louisa Finch-Hatton; The Hon. Robert Fulke Greville
- Parents: Francis Greville (father); Elizabeth Hamilton (mother)

Lieutenant-Colonel Hon. Robert Fulke Greville FRS (3 February 1751 – 27 April 1824) was a British Army officer, courtier and politician who sat in the House of Commons between 1774 and 1807.

== Life ==
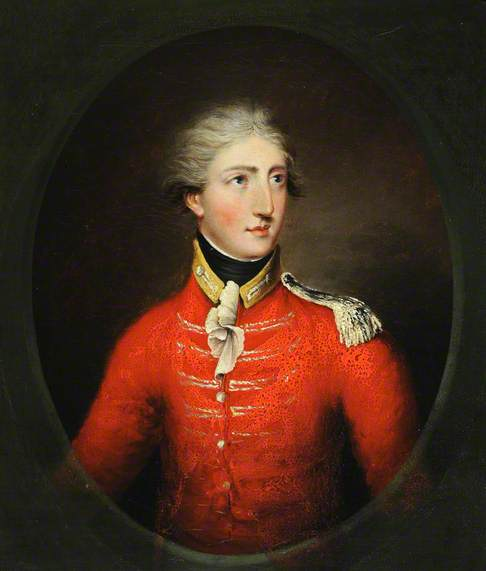
Portrait of Robert Fulke Greville (1751–1824), British Army officer, courtier and politician.

He was the third son of Francis Greville, 1st Earl of Warwick, and his wife, the former Elizabeth Hamilton, he was a younger brother of George Greville, 2nd Earl of Warwick, and of Charles Francis Greville. He was educated at the University of Edinburgh. He was commissioned as a cornet in the 10th Dragoons in 1768, and promoted to lieutenant in 1772; he transferred to the 1st Foot Guards in April 1775 and became captain the same year, then lieutenant-colonel in 1777. He saw little or no active service and perhaps the most notable aspect of his army career was as an equerry to King George III from 1781 to 1797. This included the king's first bout of physical and mental illness, then known as madness, for which Greville's diaries are a valuable primary source. Some incidents from them were incorporated into the play The Madness of George III and its film adaptation – a fictionalised Greville appears in both of them, played in the film by Rupert Graves.

Greville's duties as an equerry did not prevent him starting a parliamentary career, initially as Member of Parliament for Warwick from 1774 to 1780, supporting the Tory government of Lord North. He went with the king's household on its 1794 season in Weymouth, again recording it in his diary in considerable detail. 1794 also saw Greville elected a Fellow of the Royal Society.

In 1796, a year before leaving his post as equerry, he was elected Member of Parliament for New Windsor, holding the constituency for ten years. On 19 October 1797, he married his 1st cousin Louisa Murray (née Cathcart), Countess of Mansfield – she was the widow of David Murray and daughter of Charles Cathcart, 9th Lord Cathcart and Jane Hamilton. He returned to the royal household as Groom of the Bedchamber from 1800 to 1818 (from 1812 at Windsor Castle after the final onset of George III's illness). His diaries recounting the period are now held in the Royal Collection.

Fanny Burney referred to Greville as "Colonel Wellbred" and he was a favourite at court. Emma, Lady Hamilton, who had been the mistress of his brother Charles and wife of their uncle Sir William Hamilton, wrote to Robert on several occasions, seeking financial assistance.

Greville died on 27 April 1824. His brother Charles Francis had founded the port of Milford Haven and Robert's son and namesake attempted to make improvements to it.

Parliament of Great Britain
Preceded by Charles Greville; Paul Methuen	Member of Parliament for Warwick; 1774–1780; With: Charles Greville	Succeeded by Charles Greville; Robert Ladbroke
Preceded by The Earl of Mornington; William Grant	Member of Parliament for New Windsor; 1796–1800; With: Henry Isherwood 1796–1797; Sir William Johnston 1797–1800	Succeeded by Parliament of the United Kingdom
Parliament of the United Kingdom
Preceded by Parliament of Great Britain	Member of Parliament for New Windsor; 1801–1806; With: Sir William Johnston 1801–02; John Williams 1802–04; Arthur Vansittart 1804–06	Succeeded by Edward Disbrowe; Richard Ramsbottom
