= William Murray, 4th Earl of Mansfield =

British politician (1806–1898)

The Right Honourable The Earl of Mansfield KT, DL

Member of Parliament for Perthshire
- In office 1837–1840
- Preceded by: Fox Maule
- Succeeded by: Henry Home-Drummond

Member of Parliament for Norwich
- In office 1832–1837 Serving with Sir James Scarlett, Hon. Robert Campbell Scarlett
- Preceded by: Robert Grant; Richard Hanbury Gurney
- Succeeded by: Marquess of Douro; Hon. Robert Campbell Scarlett

Member of Parliament for Woodstock
- In office 1831–1832 Serving with Lord Charles Spencer-Churchill
- Preceded by: Marquess of Blandford; Lord Charles Spencer-Churchill
- Succeeded by: Marquess of Blandford

Member of Parliament for Aldborough
- In office 1830–1831 Serving with Clinton James Fynes Clinton; Michael Thomas Sadler
- Preceded by: Clinton James Fynes Clinton; Sir Alexander Cray Grant, Bt
- Succeeded by: Clinton James Fynes Clinton

Personal details
- Born: William David Murray; 21 February 1806 Portland Place, Marylebone, London
- Died: 1 August 1898 (aged 92) Scone Palace, Perth, Scotland
- Party: Conservative
- Spouse: Louisa Ellison (m. 1829; died 1837)
- Children: 2
- Parent(s): David Murray, 3rd Earl of Mansfield; Frederica Markham
- Education: Westminster School
- Alma mater: Christ Church, Oxford

William David Murray, 4th Earl of Mansfield, 3rd Earl of Mansfield, KT, DL (21 February 1806 – 1 August 1898) was a British Conservative politician, known as Lord Stormont between 1806 and 1840.

== Early life ==
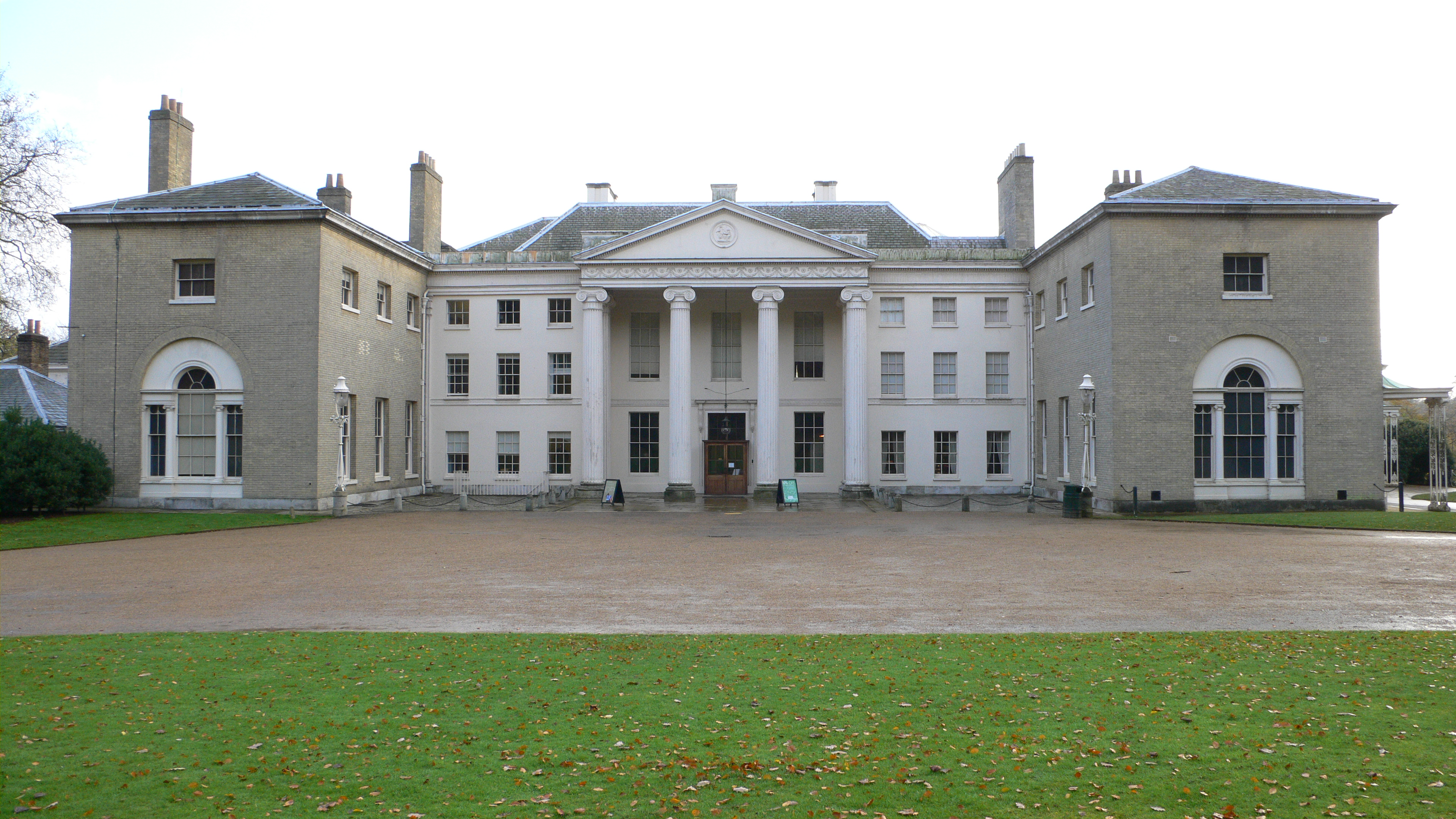
Kenwood House, Hampstead, London. Seat of the Earls of Mansfield (north facade)

Murray was born at 56 Portland Place (later renumbered to 37), known as Mansfield House, the London residence of his parents in Marylebone. He was the eldest son of nine children born to the former Frederica Markham and David Murray, 3rd Earl of Mansfield. Among his siblings were Lady Frederica Louisa Murray (who married Hon. James Hamilton Stanhope), Hon. Charles John Murray (who married Frances Elizabeth Anson, a daughter of 1st Viscount Anson), Hon. David Henry Murray (a Captain in the Scots Fusilier Guards), and Lady Emily Murray (who married Francis Seymour, 5th Marquess of Hertford).

His paternal grandparents were David Murray, 2nd Earl of Mansfield, and Louisa Murray, Countess of Mansfield (a daughter of 9th Lord Cathcart). His grandfather had succeeded to his uncle William Murray's 1792 Mansfield earldom in 1793. His maternal grandparents were Sarah (née Goddard) Markham (a daughter of John Goddard, a wealthy English merchant of Rotterdam) and William Markham, Archbishop of York. Among his maternal family were William Markham (Private Secretary to Governor-General Warren Hastings of the East India Company), Admiral John Markham, George Markham, the Dean of York, Henrietta Sarah Markham (who married Ewan Law, MP), Robert Markham, the Archdeacon of York, Osborne Markham, MP for Calne, and Alicia Henrietta Markham (who married Rev. Henry Foster Mills).

Murray was educated at Westminster School from 1816 to 1822 before matriculating at Christ Church, Oxford in 1823. After leaving Oxford, he toured Europe, attending the coronation of Czar Nicholas I in Moscow in the summer of 1826.

== Career ==
Murray was Tory Member of Parliament for Aldborough in 1830; for Woodstock in 1831; for Norwich from 1832 to 1837, and for Perthshire from 1837 to 1840. He served as a Lord of the Treasury in Sir Robert Peel's administration from 1834 to 1835. Shortly after his election to Perthshire in 1837, "he was devastated by the sudden death of his wife at the age of 28. After this blow he 'virtually abandoned public life' and 'withdrew a great measure from social functions', though he did not become entirely reclusive."

Murray was appointed Lord High Commissioner to the General Assembly of the Church of Scotland in 1852, 1858 and 1859. He was Lieutenant-Colonel of the Stirlingshire Militia from 1828 to 1855, Lord Lieutenant of Clackmannanshire from 1852, hereditary keeper of Scone Palace, and Senior Member of the Carlton Club.

He was appointed a Knight of the Thistle in 1843 and was for a time Senior Knight.

=== Peerages and estates ===
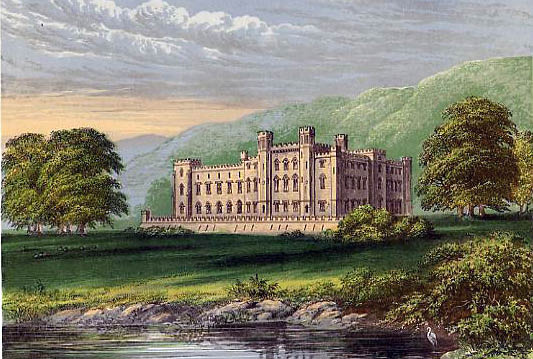
Western façade of Scone Palace, 1880

In 1840, he succeeded his father to the earldom of Mansfield (1792 creation). Three years later in 1843, he also succeeded to the second Mansfield earldom from his grandmother, Louisa Murray, 2nd Countess of Mansfield (1776 creation), both were in the Peerage of Great Britain.

In addition to Mansfield House, the Murrays also owned Kenwood House in Camden, London, and Scone Palace in Perth, Scotland. Between 1803 and 1839, his father had architect William Atkinson update and undertake essential structural reinforcements to Kenwood House. In July 1835, King William IV and Queen Adelaide paid a royal visit to Kenwood, attended by 800 of the nobility and gentry, scattered around the Kenwood garden. The Marchioness of Salisbury wrote "The King and Queen and Royalties extremely well pleased: the King trotted about with Lord M. in the most active manner".

His father also had Atkinson enlarge and recast the late 16th-century Palace of Scone. Between 1802 and 1807 at a cost of around £60,000, Atkinson had updated the old Palace whilst maintaining characteristics of the medieval Gothic abbey buildings it was built upon. The landscaping around the Palace was undertaken by John Claudius Loudon. In 1842, the 4th Earl had further work undertaken to make Scone ready for the visit of Queen Victoria and Prince Albert.

By the 1880s, Lord Mansfield had an estimated income of £45,000 a year.

== Personal life ==
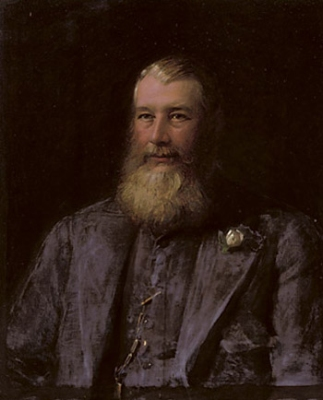
Portrait of his son, William David Murray, Viscount Stormont, by William Edwards Miller

On 8 April 1829, while styled Viscount Stormont, he married Louisa Ellison (1809–1837), daughter of Cuthbert Ellison of Hebburn Hall, Durham, and Isabella Grace (née Ibbetson) Ellison (a daughter of Henry Ibbetson, himself a younger son of Sir Henry Ibbetson, 1st Baronet). Before her untimely death in 1837, they had one daughter and one son:

- Lady Louisa Murray (1830–1909), who married Hon. George Edwin Lascelles, a barrister who was the third son of Henry Lascelles, 3rd Earl of Harewood and Lady Louisa Thynne (a daughter of Thomas Thynne, 2nd Marquess of Bath).
- William David Murray (1835–1893), styled Viscount Stormont, who married Emily Louisa Murray Macgregor, a daughter of Sir John Murray-Macgregor, 3rd Baronet and Mary Charlotte Hardy (youngest daughter and co-heiress of Rear-Admiral Sir Thomas Hardy, 1st Baronet), in 1857.

The Viscountess Stormont died in 1837. Lord Mansfield died at Scone Palace in Perth, Scotland on 1 August 1898. As his only son predeceased him, he was succeeded by his grandson William Murray, 8th Lord Balvaird.

=== Descendants ===
Through his daughter Lady Louisa Lascelles, he was a grandfather of David Arthur George Lascelles, Evelyn Louisa Lascelles, Alice Margaret (née Lascelles) Hartley (wife of the Rev. J. Thorneycroft Hartley), Sir Alfred George Lascelles (the Chief Justice of Ceylon), Edward George Lascelles, the Rev. Maurice George Lascelles, Blanche Lascelles, Agnes Nina Lascelles, Arthur George Lascelles, Ernest George Lascelles and Margaret Emily Lascelles.

Through his son William, Viscount Stormont, he was a grandfather of William Murray, 5th Earl of Mansfield, Lady Marjory Louisa Murray (wife of Sir Kenneth Mackenzie, 7th Baronet), Lt.-Col. Andrew David Murray (who was killed in action in South Africa), Alan Murray, 6th Earl Mansfield, Hon. Angus David David Murray, Maj. Hon. Alexander David Murray (who married Christian Maule Stewart-Richardson, a daughter of Sir James Stewart-Richardson, 14th Baronet) and Lady Mabel Emily Murray (wife of Admiral Sir Herbert Goodenough King-Hall).

== Arms ==
Coat of arms of William Murray, 4th Earl of Mansfield

Coronet
A Coronet of an Earl
Crest
A Buck's Head couped Or with a Cross Patée between his antlers Argent
Escutcheon
Quarterly: 1st and 4th, Azure three Mullets Argent within a Double Tressure flory counterflory Or (Murray); 2nd and 3rd, Gules three Crosses Patée Argent (Barclay)
Supporters
On either side a Lion Gules armed Or

Parliament of the United Kingdom
Preceded by Clinton James Fynes Clinton; Sir Alexander Cray Grant, Bt	Member of Parliament for Aldborough; 1830–1831; With: Clinton James Fynes Clinton	Succeeded by Clinton James Fynes Clinton; Michael Thomas Sadler
Preceded by Marquess of Blandford; Lord Charles Spencer-Churchill	Member of Parliament for Woodstock; 2-seat constituency until 1832; 1831–1832; With: Lord Charles Spencer-Churchill	Succeeded by Marquess of Blandford
Preceded by Robert Grant; Richard Hanbury Gurney	Member of Parliament for Norwich; 1832–1837; With: Sir James Scarlett 1832–1835; Hon. Robert Campbell Scarlett 1835–1837	Succeeded by Marquess of Douro; Hon. Robert Campbell Scarlett
Preceded by Fox Maule	Member of Parliament for Perthshire; 1837–1840	Succeeded by Henry Home-Drummond
Honorary titles
Preceded by The Lord Abercromby	Lord Lieutenant of Clackmannanshire; 1852–1898	Succeeded by The Earl of Mar
Peerage of Great Britain
Preceded by Louisa Murray	Earl of Mansfield; 1st creation 1843–1898	Succeeded by William David Murray
Preceded by David William Murray	Earl of Mansfield; 2nd creation 1840–1898	Succeeded by William David Murray
