= Frederica Murray, Countess of Mansfield =

- Countess of Mansfield
- Successor: Louisa Murray
- Born: Frederica Markham; 1774
- Died: 29 April 1860 (aged 86)
- Noble family: Murray, Markham
- Spouses: David William Murray, 3rd Earl of Mansfield
- Issue: Lady Frederica Louisa Murray; Lady Elizabeth Anne Murray; Lady Caroline Murray, William David Murray, 4th Earl of Mansfield, Lady Georgina Catherine Murray, Honourable Charles John Murray, Honourable David Henry Murray; Lady Cecilia Sarah Murray; Lady Emily Murray
- Father: William Markham, Archbishop of York
- Mother: Sarah Goddard

Frederica Murray, Countess of Mansfield (born Frederica Markham; 1774 – 29 April 1860), formerly Frederica Markham, was the wife of David William Murray, 3rd Earl of Mansfield.

Frederica was one of the seven daughters of William Markham, Archbishop of York, and his wife, the former Sarah Goddard. She also had six brothers, one of whom was Admiral John Markham. Another, George, was Dean of York.

As her father was a very close friend of David Murray, 2nd Earl of Mansfield, Frederica might possibly be named after the first wife of the 2nd Earl who was Countess Henrietta Frederica.

In 1796 her husband succeeded his father, David Murray, 2nd Earl of Mansfield, as Earl of Mansfield; he inherited Kenwood House in Camden, London. The family also had homes in Scotland and Ireland. The following year, on 16 September 1797, he married Frederica.

They had nine children:

1. Lady Frederica Louisa Murray (1800–1823), who married James Hamilton Stanhope and had children
2. Lady Elizabeth Anne Murray (1803–1880), unmarried
3. Lady Caroline Murray (1805–1873), who became Lady of the Bedchamber to Princess Mary, Duchess of Gloucester and Edinburgh
4. William David (1806–1898), who succeeded as 4th Earl of Mansfield, married Louisa Ellison, and had children
5. Lady Georgina Catherine Murray (1807–1871)
6. Honourable Charles John Murray (1810–1851), who married Frances Elizabeth, daughter of Thomas Anson, 1st Viscount Anson, and had children
7. Honourable David Henry Murray (1811–1862), a captain in the Scots Fusilier Guards, who married Margaret Grant, Lady Gray, and had no children
8. Lady Cecilia Sarah Murray (1814–1830)
9. Lady Emily Murray (1816–1902), who married Francis Seymour, later 5th Marquess of Hertford, and had children

The countess's father, the Archbishop of York, died in 1807. The countess is thought to have been responsible for extensive works carried out on Kenwood House in the period 1813–1816, which necessitated a doubling of staff.
