= Walter Erskine =

Walter Erskine may refer to:

- Walter Erskine, Earl of Mar and Kellie (1839–1888), Scottish peer
- Walter Erskine, Earl of Mar and Kellie (1865–1955), Scottish nobleman
