= David William Murray, 3rd Earl of Mansfield =

British army officer and peer (1777–1840)

The Right Honourable The Earl of Mansfield KT FRS
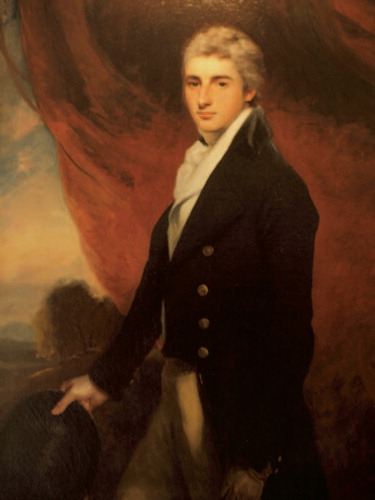

Lord Lieutenant of Clackmannanshire
- In office 4 May 1803 – 18 February 1840
- Preceded by: The Lord Cathcart
- Succeeded by: George Abercromby

Personal details
- Born: David William Murray; 7 March 1777 Paris, France
- Died: 18 February 1840 (aged 62) Leamington, United Kingdom
- Spouse: Frederica Markham (m. 1797)
- Children: 9, including William and Emily
- Parent(s): David Murray, 2nd Earl of Mansfield; Louisa Murray, 2nd Countess of Mansfield

David William Murray, 3rd Earl of Mansfield, KT (7 March 1777 – 18 February 1840) was a British army officer and peer, who served as Lord Lieutenant of Clackmannanshire from 1803 until his death.

== Early life ==
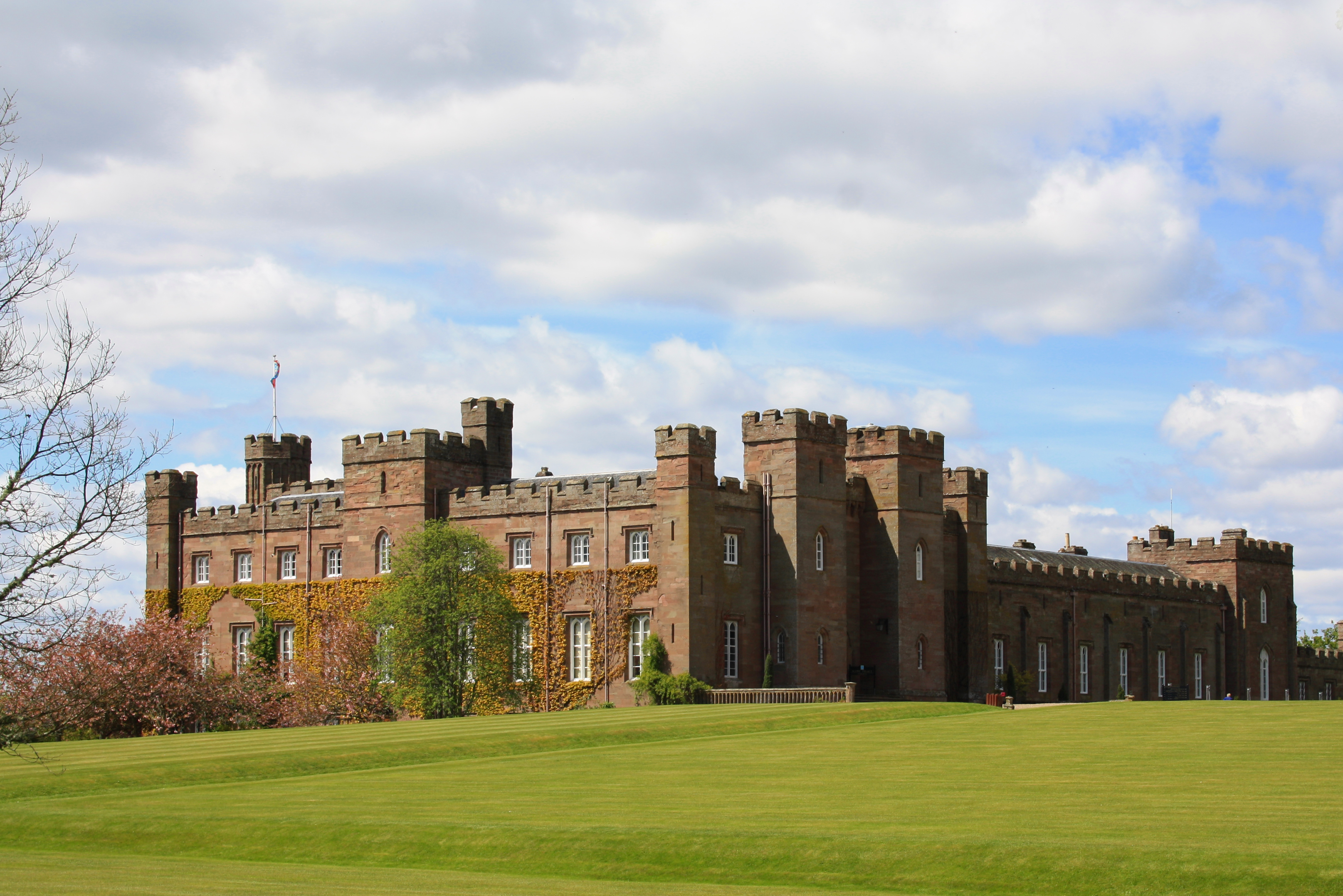
Scone Palace, Perthshire, Scotland.

Murray was born in Paris in 1777 to David Murray, then 7th Viscount Stormont, by his second wife Louisa, daughter of Charles Cathcart, 9th Lord Cathcart and Jane Hamilton. In 1792 Murray's father succeeded to his uncle William Murray's 1792 creation of the Mansfield earldom and became 2nd Earl of Mansfield in 1793; Murray succeeded his father in 1796 as 3rd Earl of Mansfield and inheriting Kenwood House in Camden, London.

Mary Hamilton, his mother's first cousin, visited Kenwood and described "little William had written an answer to a letter from his great uncle Lord Mansfield—the style was easy & the language perfectly good—no one would imagine this letter to have been written by a boy of 7 years old—he has very astonishing abilities of comprehension equally surprising for his age."

He was educated at Westminster School; at Leipzig University, Germany and at Christ Church, Oxford. He received a degree, Doctor of Civil Law, from Christ Church, Oxford in 1793. He joined the Militia, becoming Colonel of the East Middlesex Militia in 1798, transferring to the Royal Perth Militia on 3 May 1803.

== Career ==
Mansfield served as Lord Lieutenant of Clackmannanshire from 1803 until his death.

In 1835, Mansfield was elected a Knight of the Order of the Thistle. He was also a Fellow of the Royal Society (elected 1802) and a Fellow of the Society of Antiquaries of London.

=== Kenwood House ===
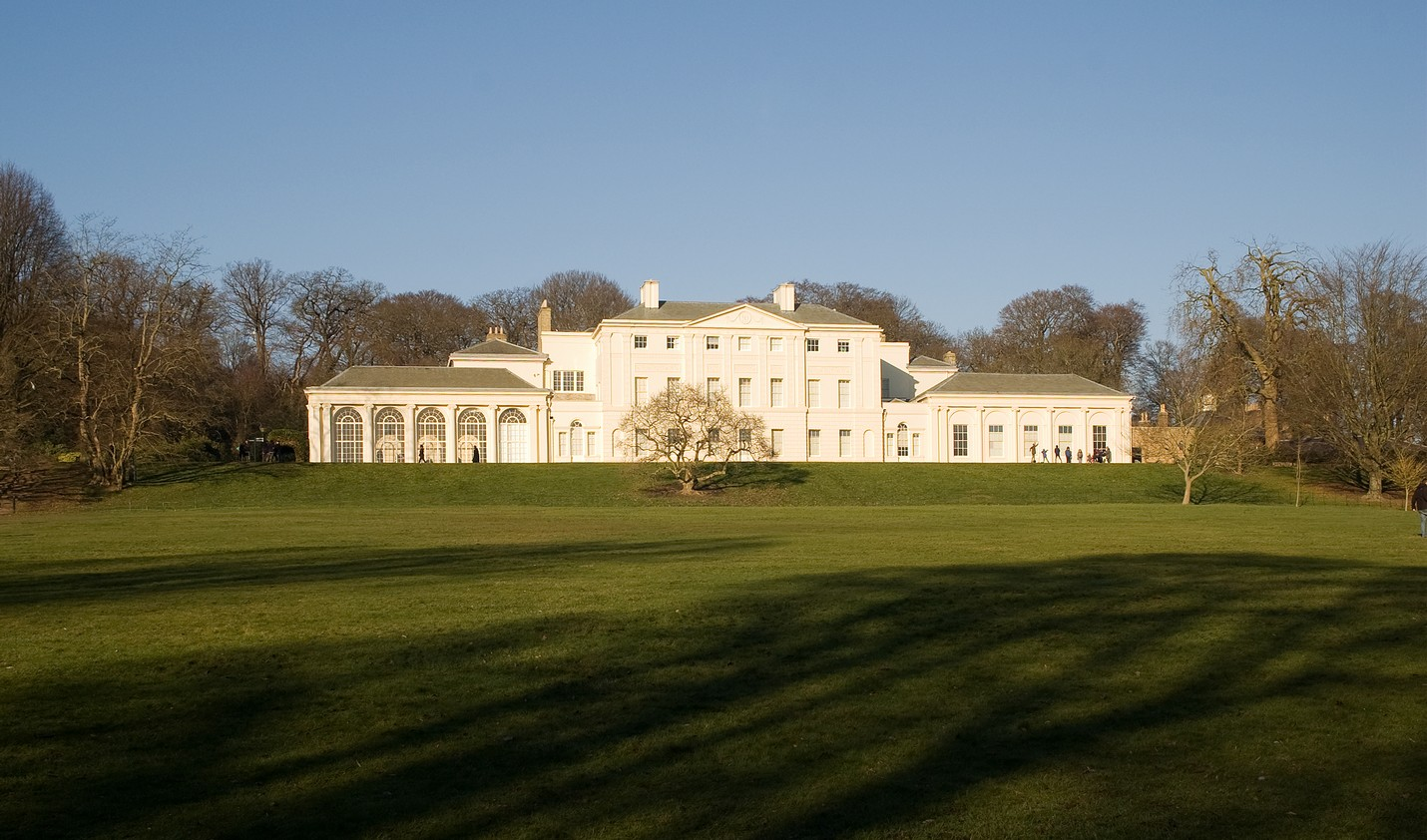
Kenwood House, Hampstead, London.

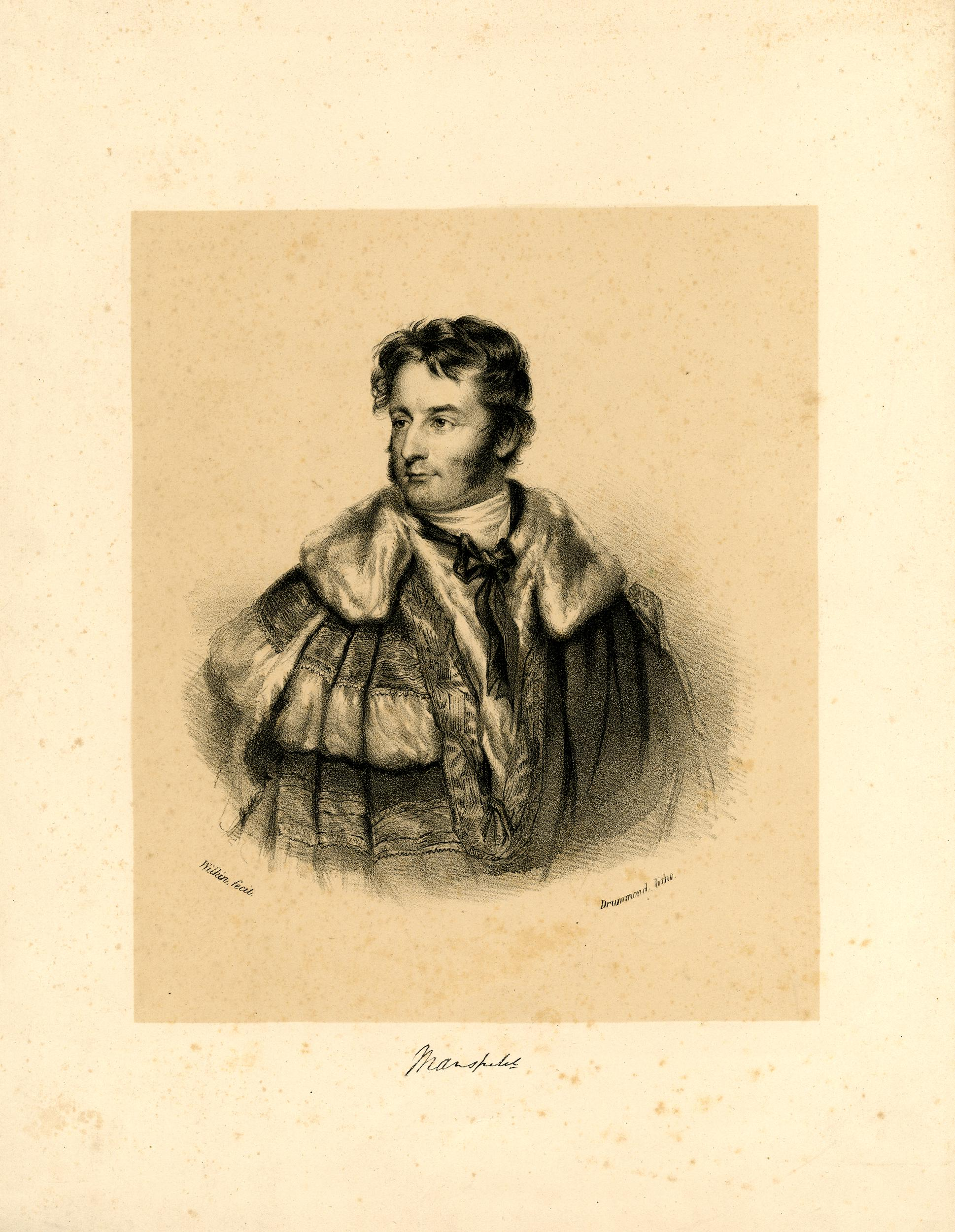
Portrait of David, half-length to front, with head turned three-quarters to left, wearing peer's fur-trimmed robe; after Wilkin.

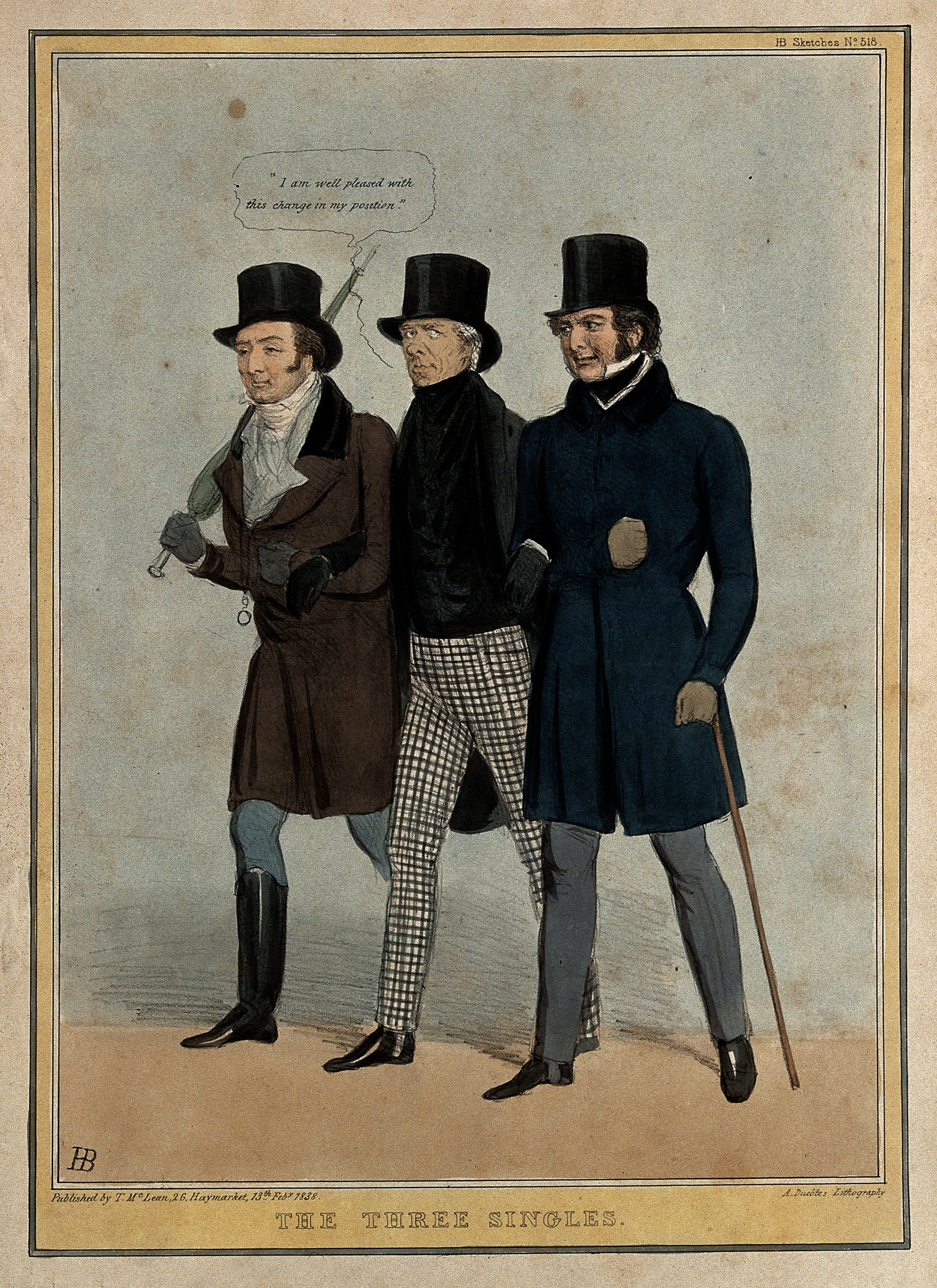
The Three Singles. Caricature of Lord Mansfield, Lord Brougham, Lord Ellenborough (left to right) by John Doyle, 1838.

Mansfield appointed William Atkinson to undertake essential structural reinforcement to Kenwood house between 1803 and 1839. Although the Mansfields preferred to live at their Scottish seat, Scone Palace, which had also been previously rebuilt by William Atkinson.

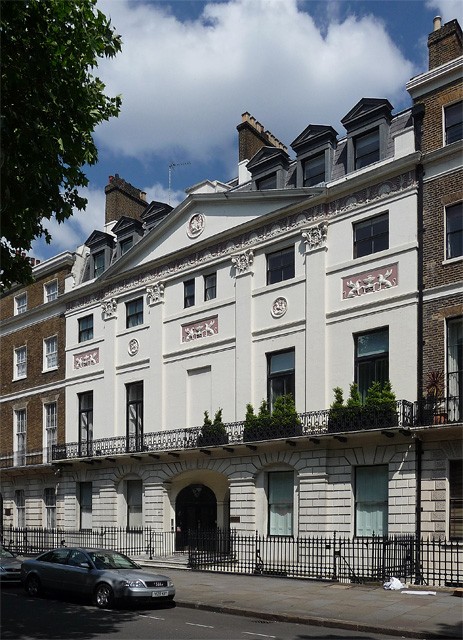
No. 37 Portland Place would have the same Adams facade as its twin No. 46-48 across.

In March 1805, Lord Mansfield gave a grand dinner at Mansfield House in Portland Place, the guests included Prince Adolphus, Duke of Cambridge, Marquess and Marchioness of Bath, Lord Grantham, Lord Somerville, and his sister Lady Elizabeth Finch-Hatton with her husband.

When his eldest daughter Lady Frederica died in 1823, Mansfield took his greatly afflicted and depressed son in law to live at Kenwood, but he never recovered and died in 1825, the jury gave a verdict of "temporary insanity".

In July 1835, King William IV and Queen Adelaide paid a royal visit to Kenwood, this was attended by 800 of the nobility and gentry, scattered around the Kenwood garden. The Marchioness of Salisbury wrote "The King and Queen and Royalties extremely well pleased: the King trotted about with Lord M. in the most active manner".

== Personal life ==
On 16 September 1797, Mansfield married Frederica Markham, a daughter of Sarah Goddard and William Markham, the Archbishop of York. William Markham was a very close friend of his father, the 2nd Earl of Mansfield. Frederica was even possibly named after the 2nd Earl's dear first wife Countess Henrietta Frederica. They had nine children:

1. Lady Frederica Louisa Murray (1800–1823), who married Hon. James Hamilton Stanhope in 1823 and had one son, James Stanhope.
2. Lady Elizabeth Anne Murray (born 1803), who died unmarried.
3. Lady Caroline Murray (born 1805), who died unmarried.
4. William David (1806–1898), who succeeded as 4th Earl of Mansfield and married Louisa, third daughter of Cutbbert Ellison, in 1829 and had issue.
5. Lady Georgina Catherine Murray (born 1807).
6. Honourable Charles John Murray (born 1810), who married Frances Elizabeth, second surviving daughter of Thomas Anson, 1st Viscount Anson in 1835.
7. Honourable David Henry Murray (born 1811), a Captain in the Scots Fusilier Guards.
8. Lady Cecilia Sarah Murray (1814–1830), who died unmarried.
9. Lady Emily Murray (1816–1902), married Francis Seymour, later 5th Marquess of Hertford, in 1839 and had issue.

In 1803, his second daughter was christened by Archbishop of York as Lady Elizabeth Anne Murray, she was named after his sister and his aunt, Lady Elizabeth and Lady Anne Murray who were present during the christening.

Mansfield died at Leamington on 18 February 1840 and is buried in St Andrew's Churchyard, Kingsbury, London.

Honorary titles
Preceded by The Lord Cathcart	Lord Lieutenant of Clackmannanshire; 1803–1840	Succeeded by George Abercromby
Peerage of Great Britain
Preceded by David Murray	Earl of Mansfield; 2nd creation 1796–1840	Succeeded by William David Murray
