= David Taylor Fish =

Scottish gardener (1824–1901)

David Taylor Fish FRHA (25 September 1824 — 22 April 1901) was a 19th-century Scottish gardener and horticultural writer.

== Life ==
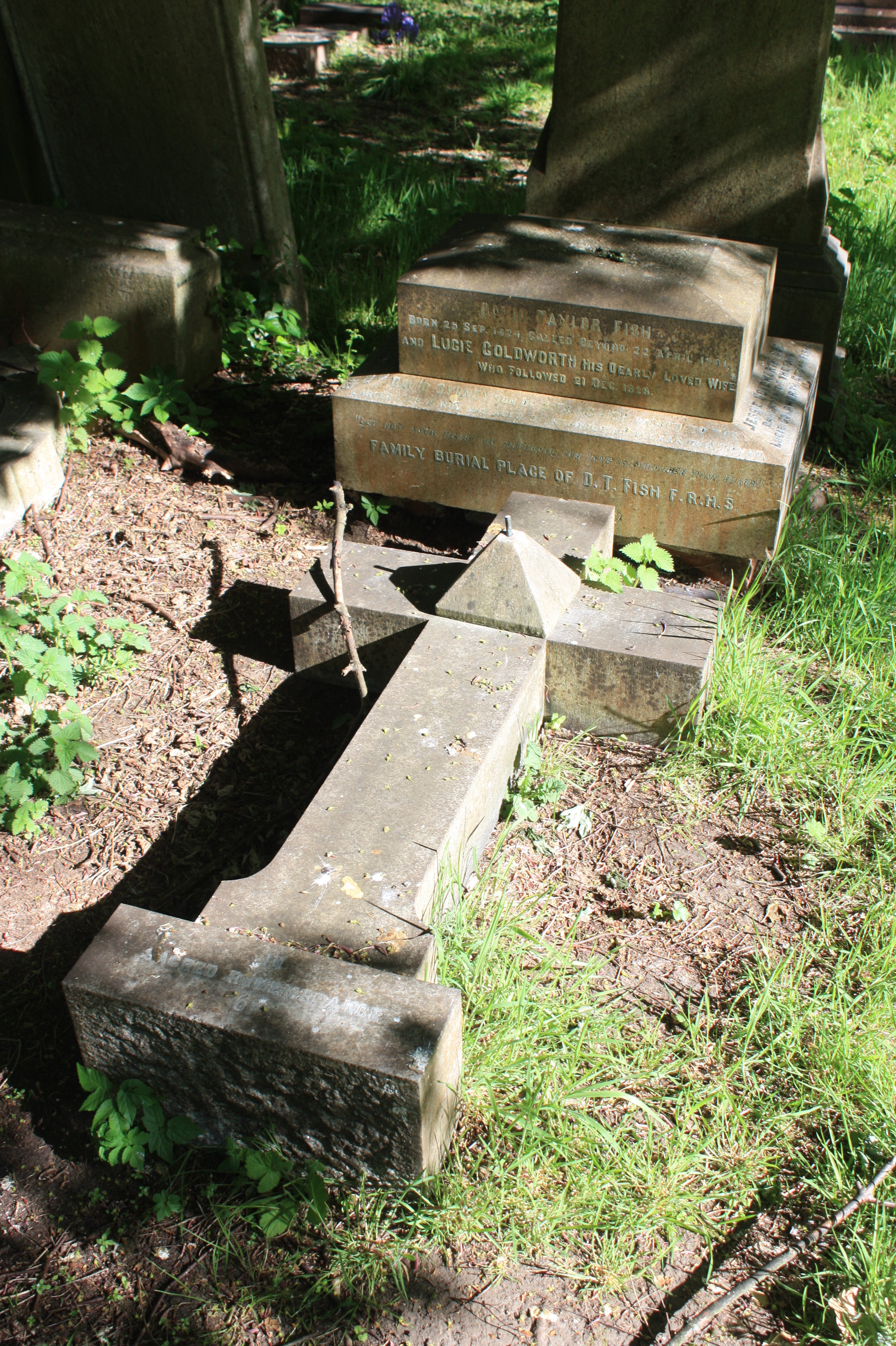
The grave of David Taylor Fish, Warriston Cemetery, Edinburgh

David Fish was born at Old Scone, Scotland, United Kingdom on 25 September 1824. He was younger brother to Robert Fish (1808–1873), also a gardener and horticulturalist.

He followed in the footsteps of David Douglas -- also from Scone -- from whom he would have learnt much and acquired a desire to study plants as well as grow them. Around 1838, while a teenager, Fish began working as an apprentice at Scone Palace under James Dodds. From 1842 to 1845 he worked at Putteridge Bury, under his brother and then was head gardener at various manor houses and estates, including Hardwick House in Suffolk, where he remained for many years, starting in 1855. Following his time there, Fish was primarily a lecturer and writer. He retired to Edinburgh in 1896.

Fish died at age 76 on 22 April 1901 at his home, 12 Fettes Row in Edinburgh in Edinburgh's New Town. He is buried in Warriston Cemetery in north Edinburgh. The grave is broken but remains wholly legible.

== Family ==
Fish married Lucie Coldworth (d.1928).

He was father to David Sydney Fish (1881–1912) who became a gardener at the Royal Botanic Garden, Edinburgh then to Alexandria in Egypt, where he died. He was an orchid collector and also a horticultural author.

== Publications ==
- Cherry and Medlar (1881)
- Pear (1881)
- Chrysanthemum (1881)
- Cassell's Popular Gardening editor 1884-6
- The Peach and Nectarine
- Bulbs and Bulb Culture (1884)

== Sources ==
- Desmond, Ray, ed. (1994). "FISH, David Taylor". Dictionary of British and Irish Botanists and Horticulturists including plant collectors, flower painters and garden designers. London: Taylor & Francis. p. 247. ISBN 0-85066-843-3.
