= Scone Palace =

Castle owned by the Earl of Mansfield in Perth & Kinross, Scotland

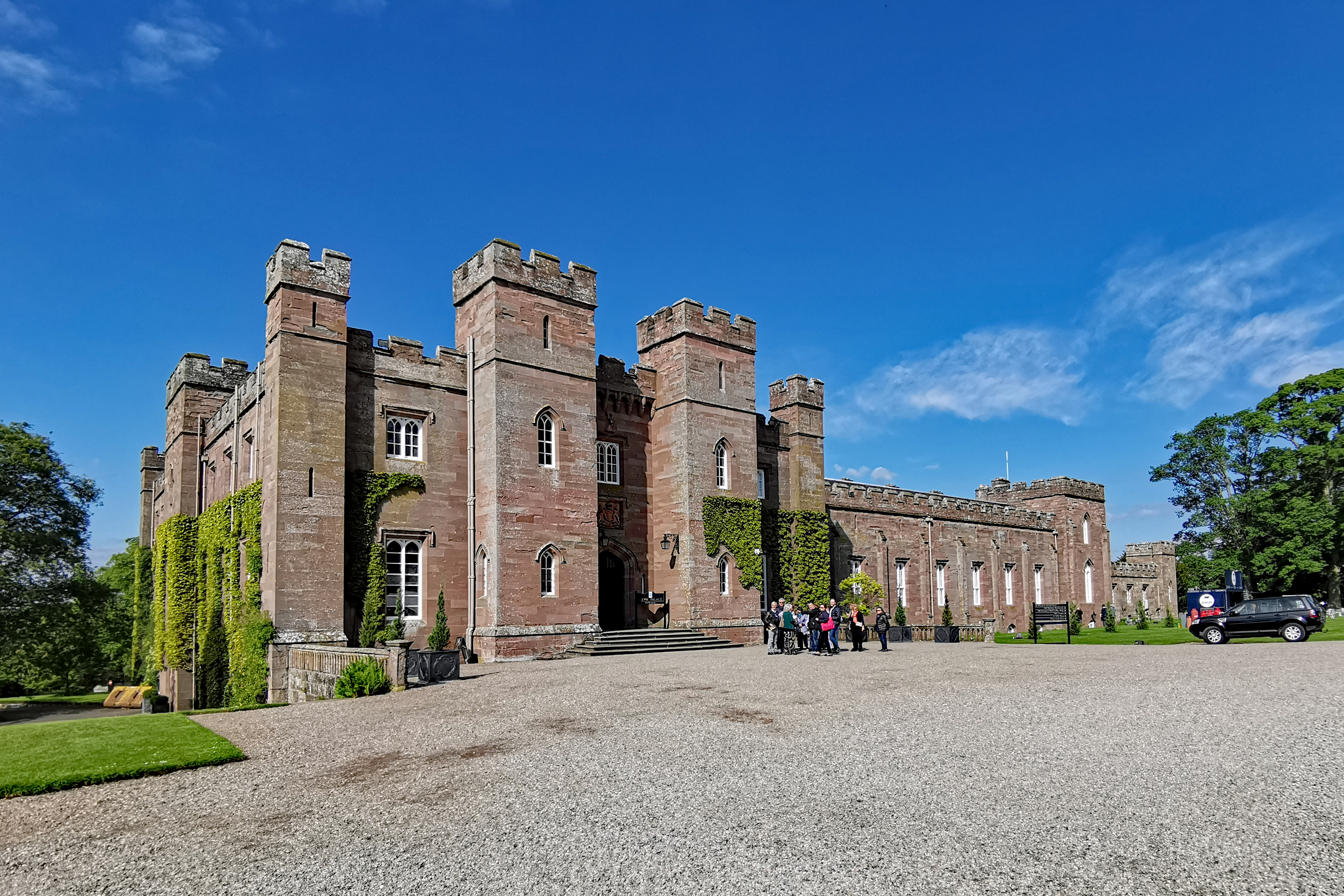
- Scone Palace, front façade

- Shown in Perth and Kinross
- 56°25′22″N 03°26′18″W
- Location: Perth, Perth and Kinross, Scotland

History
- Built: 12th century
- Rebuilt: 1802–1807

Site notes
- Architect: William Atkinson
- Architectural style: Gothic Revival style

Inventory of Gardens and Designed Landscapes in Scotland
- Official name: Scone Palace
- Designated: 1 July 1987
- Reference no.: GDL00338

Scone Palace /ˈskuːn/ is a Category A-listed historic house near the village of Scone and the city of Perth, Scotland. Ancestral seat of Earls of Mansfield, built in red sandstone with a castellated roof, it is an example of the Gothic Revival style in Scotland.

Scone was originally the site of an early Christian church, and later an Augustinian priory. Scone Abbey, in the grounds of the Palace, for centuries held the Stone of Scone upon which the early Kings of Scotland were crowned. Robert the Bruce was crowned at Scone in 1306 and the last coronation was of Charles II, when he accepted the Scottish crown in 1651.

Scone Abbey was severely damaged in 1559 during the Scottish Reformation after a mob whipped up by the famous reformer, John Knox, came to Scone from Dundee. Having survived the Reformation, the Abbey in 1581 became a secular Lordship (and home) within the parish of Scone, Scotland. Since 1600 the Palace has been home to the Murrays of Tullibardine. During the early 19th century the Palace was enlarged by the architect William Atkinson. In 1802, David William Murray, 3rd Earl of Mansfield, commissioned Atkinson to extend the Palace, recasting the late 16th-century Palace of Scone. The 3rd Earl tasked Atkinson with updating the old Palace whilst maintaining characteristics of the medieval Gothic abbey buildings it was built upon, with the majority of work finished by 1807.

The Palace and its grounds, which include a collection of fir trees and a star-shaped maze, are open to the public.

== History of Scone ==
=== Prehistory and tradition ===
Scotland was one of the last kingdoms to adopt and benefit from the written word and the legal system it upheld. Only at the end of the 11th century did Scotland see a growth of record keeping, with property rights logged via legal charter and royal government practice noted in writing. It is likely that there were a few documents written before the 11th century, however, Scotland's particularly turbulent history is likely to have been witness to the loss or destruction of many documents. The first piece of hard evidence that relates to Scone is a charter dating to 906.

=== Naming of Scone ===
It is not known why exactly the area is called "Scone" (pronounced /ˈskuːn/). The search for a meaning to the word has not been helped by the fact that throughout the last 10 centuries, Scone has been written as Scon, Scoon, Scoan, Scoine, Schone, Skoon, Skune, Skuyn, Skuyne, Sgoin, Sgàin and Sgoinde. It is difficult thus to know where to start in terms of the etymology of Scone. It is known that Scone was at the heart of the ancient Pictish kingdom and thus one would think that the name would derive from the Pictish language. The existence of a distinct Pictish language during the Early Middle Ages is attested clearly in Blessed Bede's early 8th century Historia ecclesiastica gentis Anglorum, which names Pictish as a language distinct from that spoken by the Britons, the Irish, and the English.

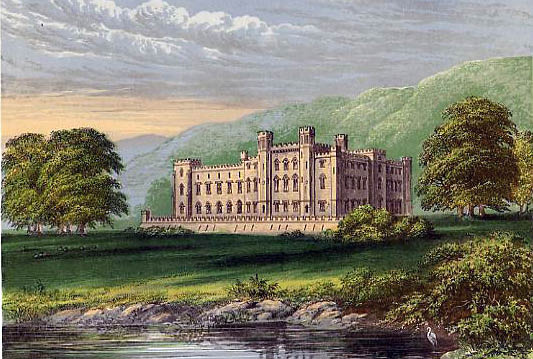
Western façade in 1880

It was thus believed that "Scone" derives from the P-Celtic word "Sken" meaning "cut" or "cutting". This has been gaelicized as "Sgàin" (pronounced "Skene"). And may be a fine example of the amalgamation of the Pictish and Gaelic cultures and languages. The Brittonic origin of the place-name "Scone" is of great importance regarding the history and status of the place, and may explain why the famous Kenneth MacAlpin, first King of Scots, chose Scone as his capital.

The meaning "cutting" could relate to what is now known as "the Friars' Den". The Gaelic origin of the place name "Scone", if not entirely discredited, is rendered more unlikely by modern analysis of place names in the east of Scotland where Scone is situated. Such analysis supports the above argument that an Insular Celtic language related to the more southerly P-Celtic Brittonic languages was formerly spoken in Pictavia (and thus not a Q-Celtic language).

=== Ancient Kingdom of Scone ===
Scone was from at least the 9th century the crowning-place of the Kings of Scots and home to the Stone of Scone, more commonly referred to as the Stone of Destiny. Kenneth MacAlpin (traditionally known as the first King of Scots), Macbeth (famous due to the play written about him by Shakespeare), Robert the Bruce, and Charles II number amongst the 42 kings of Scots inaugurated and crowned at Scone. It was believed that no king had a right to reign as king of Scots unless he had first been crowned at Scone upon the Stone of Scone. In the Middle Ages, the land was the site of a major Augustinian abbey, Scone Abbey, nothing of which now remains above ground level except detached architectural fragments. Scone was also the site of the first Parliament of Scotland, or Council/Assembly. King Constantine II in 906 called for an assembly to meet at Scone. The assembly was recorded in the Chronicle of the Kings of Alba; Alba being the early name for the early medieval Kingdom of Scotland. The Chronicle records that:

King Constantine and Bishop Cellach met at the Hill of Belief near the Royal City of Scone and pledged themselves that the laws and disciplines of the faith, and the laws of churches and gospels, should be kept pariter cum Scottis.

Scone was thus the centre of power in the ancient Kingdom of Alba, doubling up as the site of both Scottish coronations and parliaments. Further to this in medieval times Scone acted as a royal residence and hunting ground. Robert II would have spent most of his life calling Scone home. He was eventually laid to rest in the Abbey itself, although his grave has never been located. A popular old saying suggests the significance of Scone's status in the Kingdom of Alba's, and later Scotland's, governance and rule:

As the Bell of Scone rang, So mote it be.

This saying has often been re-quoted as "When the Bell of Scone tolls, the law of the land has been made". It is a statement of the great significance of the ceremonies held at Scone, and the judgments made from a top the Moot Hill. It is old sayings like this which frustrated historians, as the sayings clearly detail Scone's important role in Scottish history, and in the early formation of the Scottish nation. The primary source of much of Scone's early history and modern reputation is reliant upon Scottish folklore. An example of another piece of Scottish folklore which reminds us of Scone's position as the premier seat of power in the evolving early medieval Scottish nation is the Gaelic:

Comhairle clag Sgàin: An rud nach buin duit na bean dà.

"Counsel of the bell of Scone, Touch not what is not thine own."

In Gaelic poetry Scone's association more specifically with kings and king-making gave it various poetic epithets, for instance, Scoine sciath-airde, meaning "Scone of the High Shields", and Scoine sciath-bhinne, meaning "Scone of the Noisy Shields". The "Noisy Shields" here refer to a folkloric ceremony in which magnates would gather at Scone for a Council. As they entered the Great Hall each magnate in turn would hang their shield displaying their coats of arms on the walls before beating their weapons against them.

The mons placiti or Scone Moot Hill is the inauguration site of the Scottish Kings. It is also called 'Boot Hill', possibly from an ancient tradition whereby nobles swore fealty to their king whilst wearing the earth of their own lands in their foot-bindings or boots, or even by standing upon the earth that they had brought with them from their respective homelands (carrying the soil in their boots). The tradition being that the Moot Hill, or rather 'Boot Hill', came into being as a result of this tradition of nobles bring a piece of their own lands to Scone. The kings of Scots, themselves inaugurated upon the Moot Hill, were thus making during these ceremonies a hugely symbolic commitment to the people of Scotland, the Scots. This commitment was made from atop a hill which, if one believes the tradition, represented all parts of the kingdom of Scots and thus allowed the King to make his oaths whilst standing symbolically upon all of Scotland.

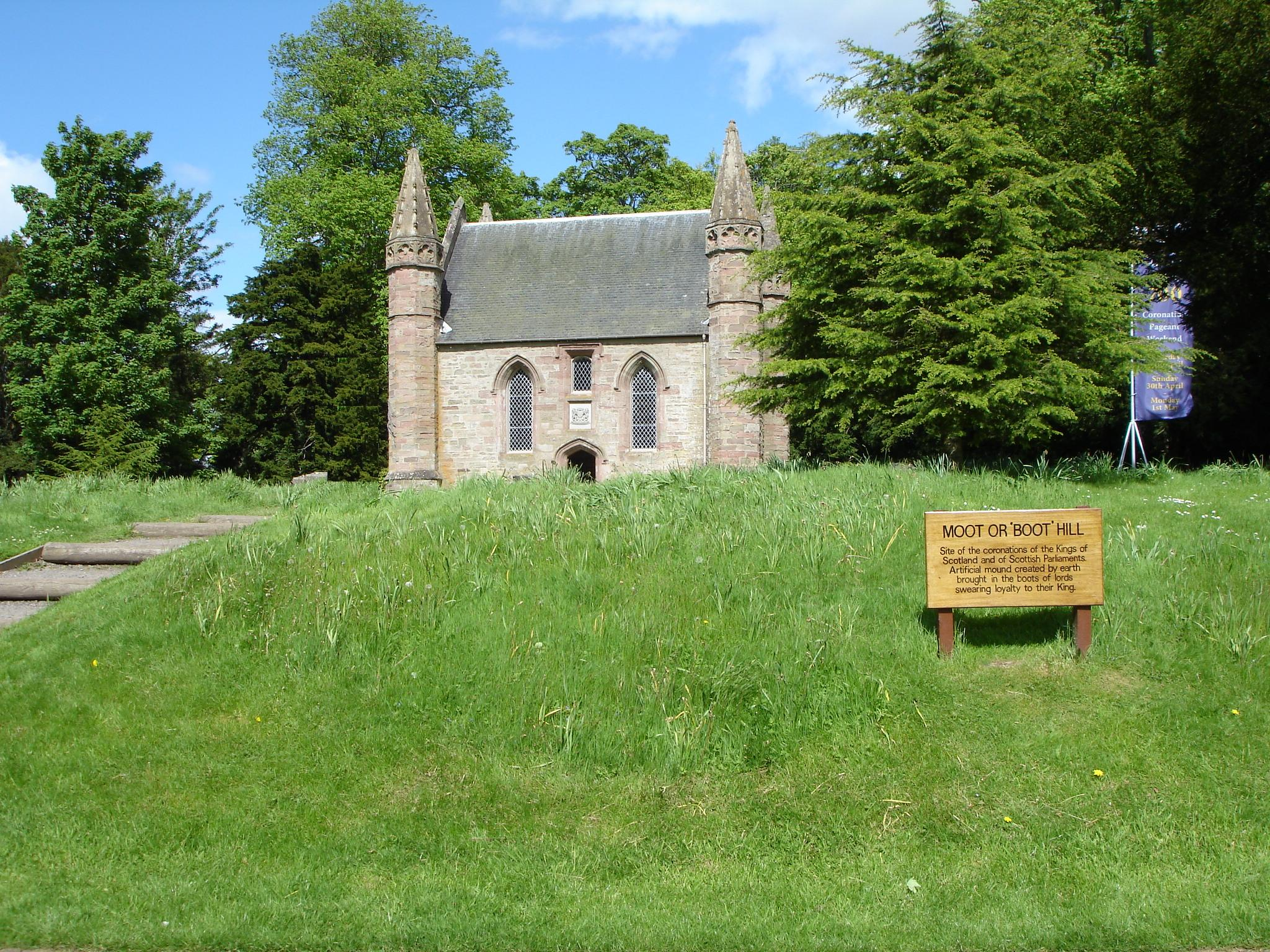
The Moot Hill and chapel at Scone, perhaps the Hill of Belief of 906

=== Scone Abbey ===
Scone was an ancient gathering place of the Picts, and was probably the site of an early Christian church. The place of coronation was called Caislean Credi, 'Hill of Credulity', which survives as the present Moot Hill. In the Middle Ages the mound was marked with a stone cross, but this disappeared probably during the Scottish Reformation in 1559, when the Abbey buildings were sacked by a mob from Dundee and led by John Knox.

From 1114 to 1559, Scone was one of Scotland's major monasteries and later abbeys. The monastery's status was 'formalised' as a result of King Alexander I's charter. A representation of the church on the Abbey's seal, and some surviving architectural fragments, show that it was built in the Romanesque style, with a central tower crowned with a spire. Between 1284 and 1402 Scone Abbey (sometimes referred to as the Palace of the Abbots) often served to house the Parliament of Scotland.

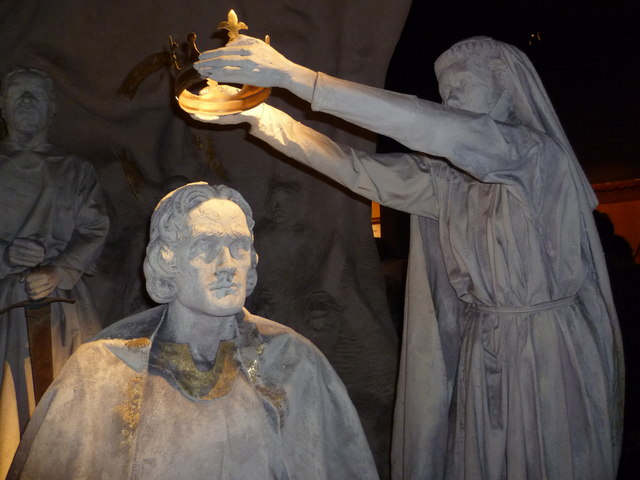
Crowning of Bruce by Isabella MacDuff, 1306

Alexander II and Alexander III, both crowned at Scone, ruled from 1214 to 1286. For centuries the greatest treasure at Scone was the Stone of Scone upon which the early Kings of Scotland were crowned. When Edward I of England carried off the Stone of Scone to Westminster Abbey in 1296, the Coronation Chair that still stands in the abbey was specially made to fit over it. Robert the Bruce was crowned at Scone in 1306 and the last coronation was of Charles II, when he accepted the Scottish crown in 1651. The Stone of Scone is now in Perth Museum.

Scone Abbey flourished for over four hundred years. In 1559, it fell victim to a mob from Dundee during the early days of the Reformation and was largely destroyed. In 1580 the abbey estates were granted to Lord Ruthven, later the Earl of Gowrie, who held estates around what is now called Huntingtower Castle. The Ruthvens rebuilt the Abbot's Palace of the old abbey as a grand residence. In 1600, James VI charged the family with treason and their estates at Scone were passed to Sir David Murray of Gospetrie (later known as Lord Scone), one of James' most loyal followers.

In 1604, the Palace of Scone was the family seat of the Murrays of Scone and the 1st Lord Scone. These Murrays were a branch of the Murrays of Tullibardine (later Atholl), whose original family seat was Balvaird Castle in Fife. The branch included William Murray, 1st Earl of Mansfield, Lord Chief Justice of the King's Bench (8 November 1756 – 4 June 1788).

=== Modern palace ===
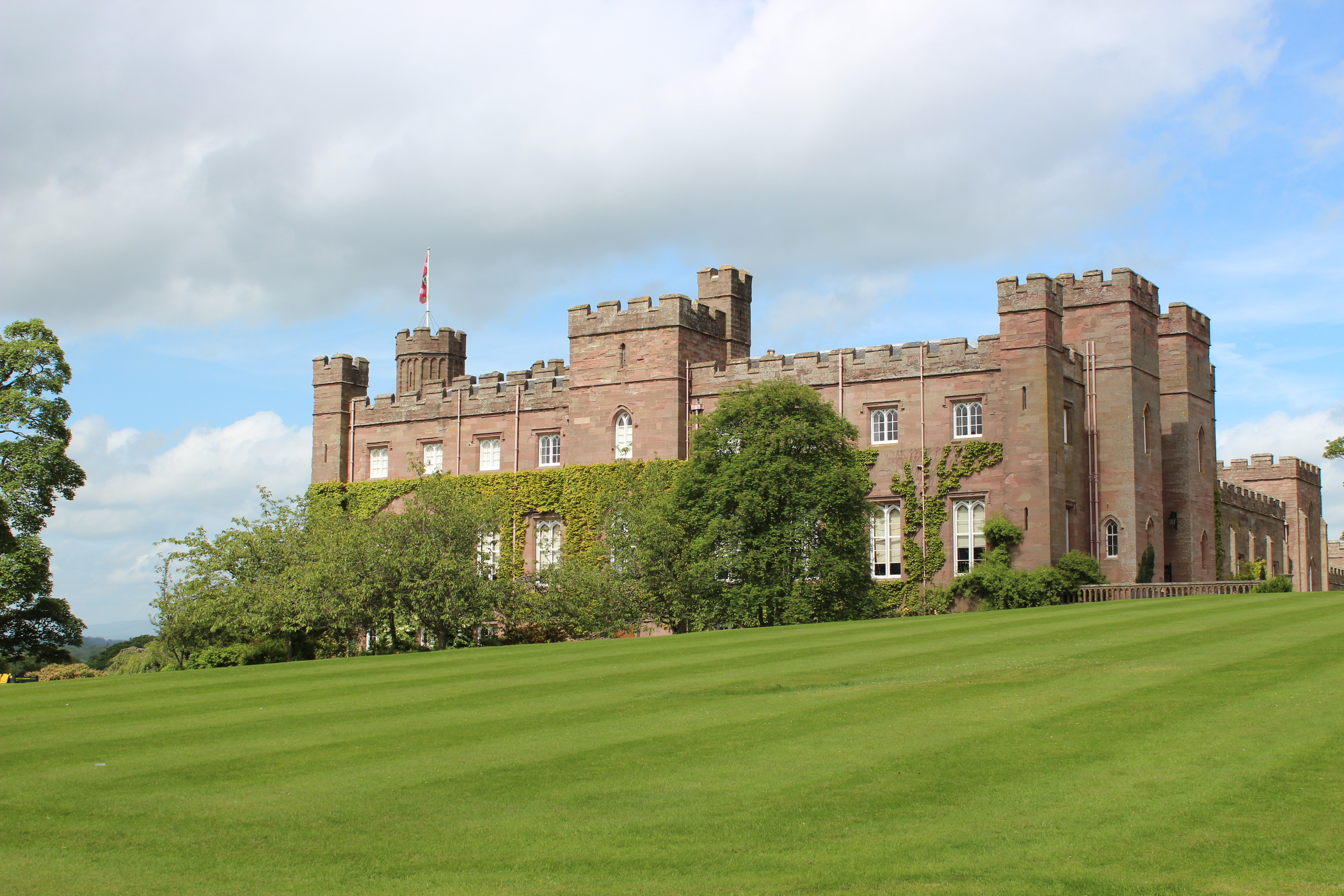
Scone Palace (2014)

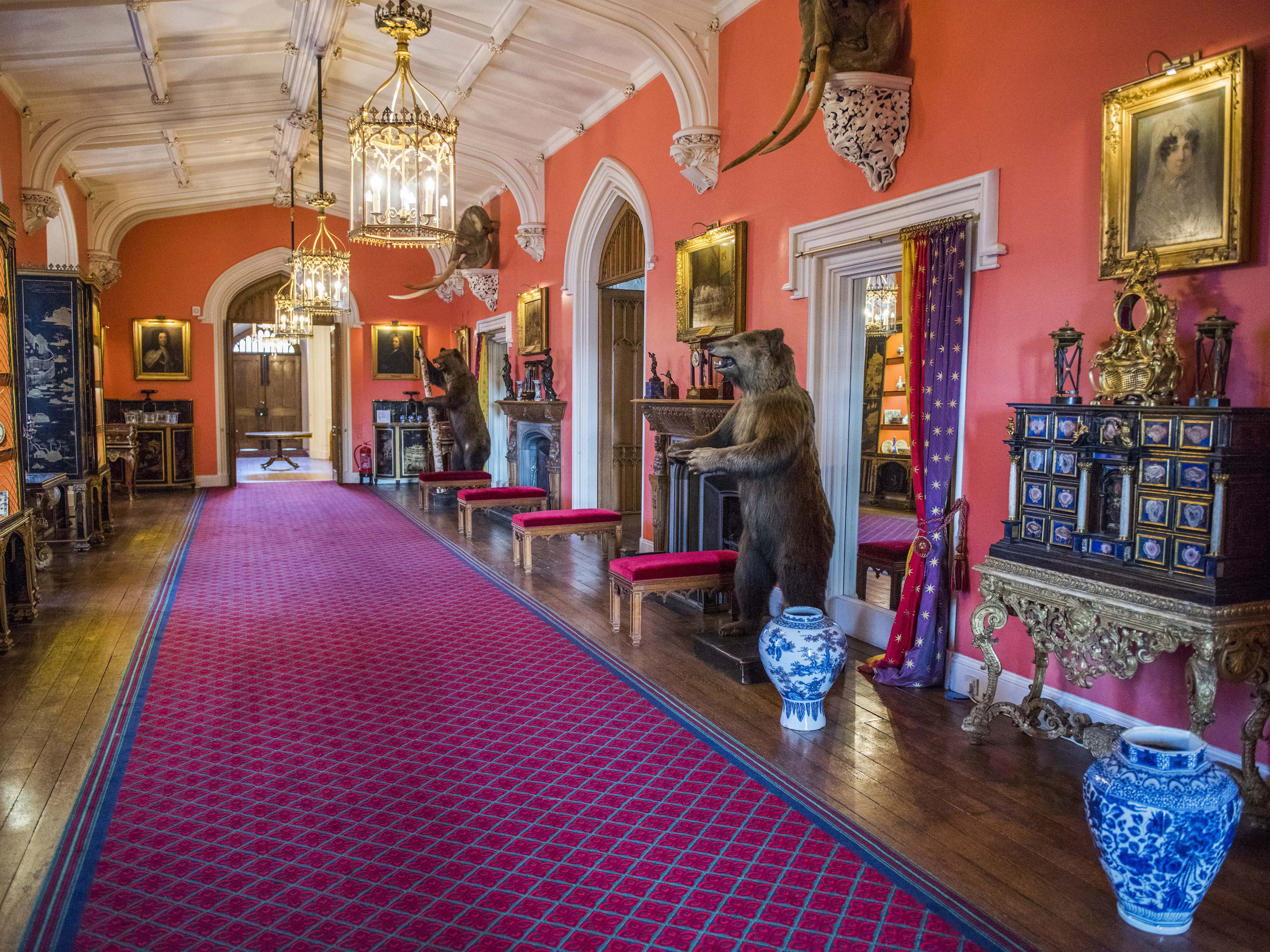
Gallery Hall

The modern palace, which was designed by William Atkinson in the Gothic Revival style for the 3rd Earl of Mansfield and built in red sandstone with a castellated roof, was completed in 1807. One of its best known features is the Long Gallery. In 1808 the 3rd Earl noted "I am happy to say that much as this place has cost me (some £60,000) and much as it still will cost me, the place more than answers our expectation". The new house had the advantage of giving the family "a handsome and agreeable residence." Landscaping work around the Palace was undertaken by John Claudius Loudon. Further work was undertaken in 1842 to make Scone Palace ready for the visit of Queen Victoria and Prince Albert.

On view in the State Rooms of Scone Palace are collections of furniture, ceramics, ivories, and clocks. Some of the prized contents of Scone Palace are Rococo chairs by Pierre Bara, further items by Robert Adam and Chippendale, Dresden and Sèvres porcelains, as well as a collection of Vernis Martin vases and a Jean-Henri Riesener writing desk given to David Murray, 2nd Earl of Mansfield, by Marie-Antoinette. The collection at Scone Palace also includes a range of Scottish and British portraiture including works by Reynolds, Ramsay, and de László. One of the best-known pieces is Sir David Wilkie's painting, "The Village Politicians". The Lennox Room, named after the Duke of Lennox, is rich in pieces with Royal connections including the bed-hanging made by Mary Queen of Scots.

The collection of large European ivories came from Bavaria, Italy, Flanders and France. They were carved in the 17th, 18th and 19th centuries in elephant and walrus tusk, and collected mainly by William David Murray, 4th Earl of Mansfield. The grounds of Scone Palace include the Moot Hill, the crowning place of the kings of Scots. A replica of the Stone of Scone sits upon the Moot Hill in front of a 17th-century chapel containing a fine monument dedicated to the 1st Lord Scone by the Flemish sculptor Maximilian Colt. The chapel also had a monument to the encapsulated heart of the first wife of the 2nd Earl of Mansfield.

The Murray Star shaped maze covers an area of 1600 square meters. It is planted in a mixture of copper and green beech, designed to resemble the Earl of Mansfield's family tartan, Ancient Murray of Tullibardine, and is in the shape of a five-pointed star which is part of the Mansfield family emblem. There are fine woodlands in the grounds and policies of Scone Palace, some of the fir trees being at least 250 years old. The grounds of the Palace were the first place in Britain to which David Douglas introduced the Douglas fir tree species.

== Notable gardeners ==
- David Douglas (botanist)
- David Taylor Fish

== Sources ==
- Bede (1910), Ecclesiastical History of England Book 1 – via sourcebooks.fordham.edu
- Forsyth, Katherine (1997), Language in Pictland: the case against 'non-Indo-European Pictish' (PDF), Utrecht: de Keltische Draak, ISBN 978-90-802785-5-4
- Forsyth, Katherine (2006), "Pictish Language and Documents", in Koch, John T. (ed.), Celtic Culture: A Historical Encyclopedia, Volume 1, Santa Barbara, California: ABC-CLIO, Inc.
- Fraser, James E. (2009), "From Caledonia to Pictland: Scotland to 795", The New Edinburgh History of Scotland, vol. 1, Edinburgh University Press
- Jackson, K. (1955), "The Pictish Language", in Wainwright, F.T. (ed.), The Problem of the Picts, Edinburgh: Nelson, pp. 129–166
- Koch, John T. (1983), "The Loss of Final Syllables and Loss of Declension in Brittonic", The Bulletin of the Board of Celtic Studies, vol. XXX, University of Wales Press
- Price, G (2000), Languages in Britain and Ireland, Oxford: Blackwell, ISBN 9780631215813
- Smyth, Alfred P. (1984), "Warlords and Holy Men", New History of Scotland, Edinburgh: Edward Arnold (Publishers) Ltd.
- Watson, W.J. (1926), Celtic Place Names of Scotland, Birlinn
- Woolf, Alex (2007), "From Pictland to Alba 789–1070", The New Edinburgh History of Scotland, vol. 2, Edinburgh University Press
