= Lord Lieutenant of Clackmannanshire =

Ceremonial officer in Clackmannanshire, Scotland

This is a list of people who have served as Lord Lieutenant of Clackmannanshire.

The official title of the office has varied over time as follows:

His or Her Majesty's Lieutenant in the County of Clackmannan 1794–1975
Lord-Lieutenant in the Central Region (District of Clackmannan) 1975–1996
Lord-Lieutenant for the Area of Clackmannan since 1996

== Lord Lieutenants ==
- David Erskine, 9th Earl of Buchan 1713 – 1715
- incomplete before 1794
- William Cathcart, 10th Lord Cathcart 17 March 1794 – 1798
- Sir Ralph Abercromby 13 August 1798 – 28 March 1801
- William Cathcart, 10th Lord Cathcart 18 December 1801 – 1803
- David Murray, 3rd Earl of Mansfield 18 March 1803 – 18 February 1840
- Lt-Col. George Abercromby, 3rd Baron Abercromby 20 April 1840 – 25 June 1852
- William Murray, 4th Earl of Mansfield and Mansfield 30 July 1852 – 2 August 1898
- Walter Erskine, 12th Earl of Mar 14 October 1898 – 3 June 1955
- Capt. James Paton Younger 15 August 1955 – 1966
- John Erskine, 13th Earl of Mar 30 September 1966 – 22 December 1993
- vacant
- Lt-Col. Robert Christie Stewart 16 January 1995 – 2001
- Sheena Cruickshank 27 September 2001 – 23 May 2011
- George Reid 23 May 2011 – 4 June 2014
- Lt-Col. John Stewart 5 June 2014 –
