= Francis Seymour, 5th Marquess of Hertford =

British politician

General The Most Honourable The Marquess of Hertford GCB PC
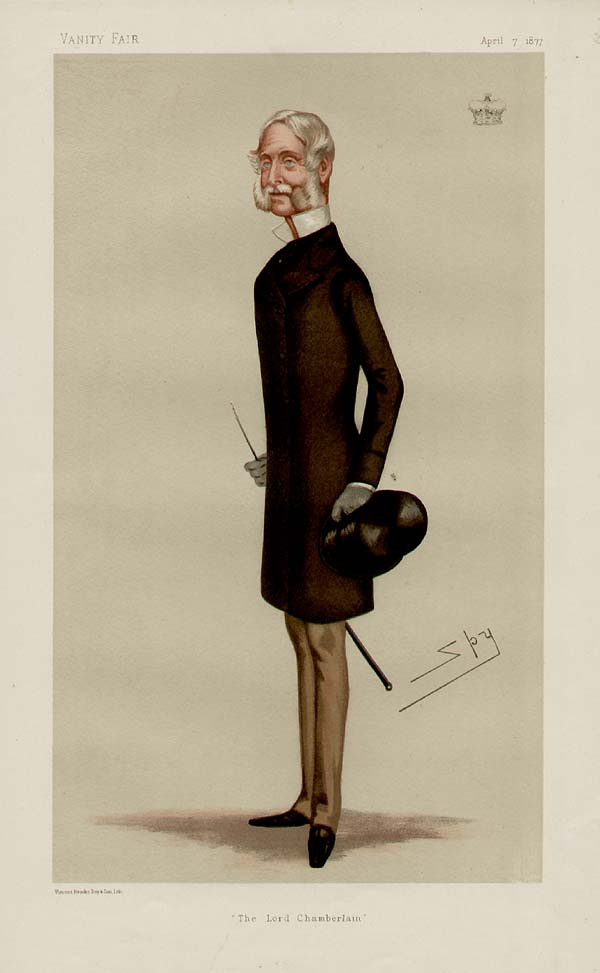
- "The Lord Chamberlain". The Marquess of Hertford as caricatured by Spy (Leslie Ward) in Vanity Fair, April 1877.

Lord Chamberlain of the Household
- In office 21 February 1874 – 7 May 1879
- Monarch: Victoria
- Prime Minister: Benjamin Disraeli
- Preceded by: The Viscount Sydney
- Succeeded by: The Earl of Mount Edgcumbe

Personal details
- Born: Francis George Hugh Seymour; 11 February 1812
- Died: 25 January 1884 (aged 71) Ragley Hall, Warwickshire, United Kingdom
- Party: Conservative
- Spouse: Lady Emily Murray
- Children: 10, including Hugh

Francis George Hugh Seymour, 5th Marquess of Hertford, GCB, PC (11 February 1812 – 25 January 1884), known as Francis Seymour until 1870, was a British army officer, courtier and Conservative politician. He served as Lord Chamberlain of the Household under Benjamin Disraeli from 1874 to 1879.

== Family and education ==
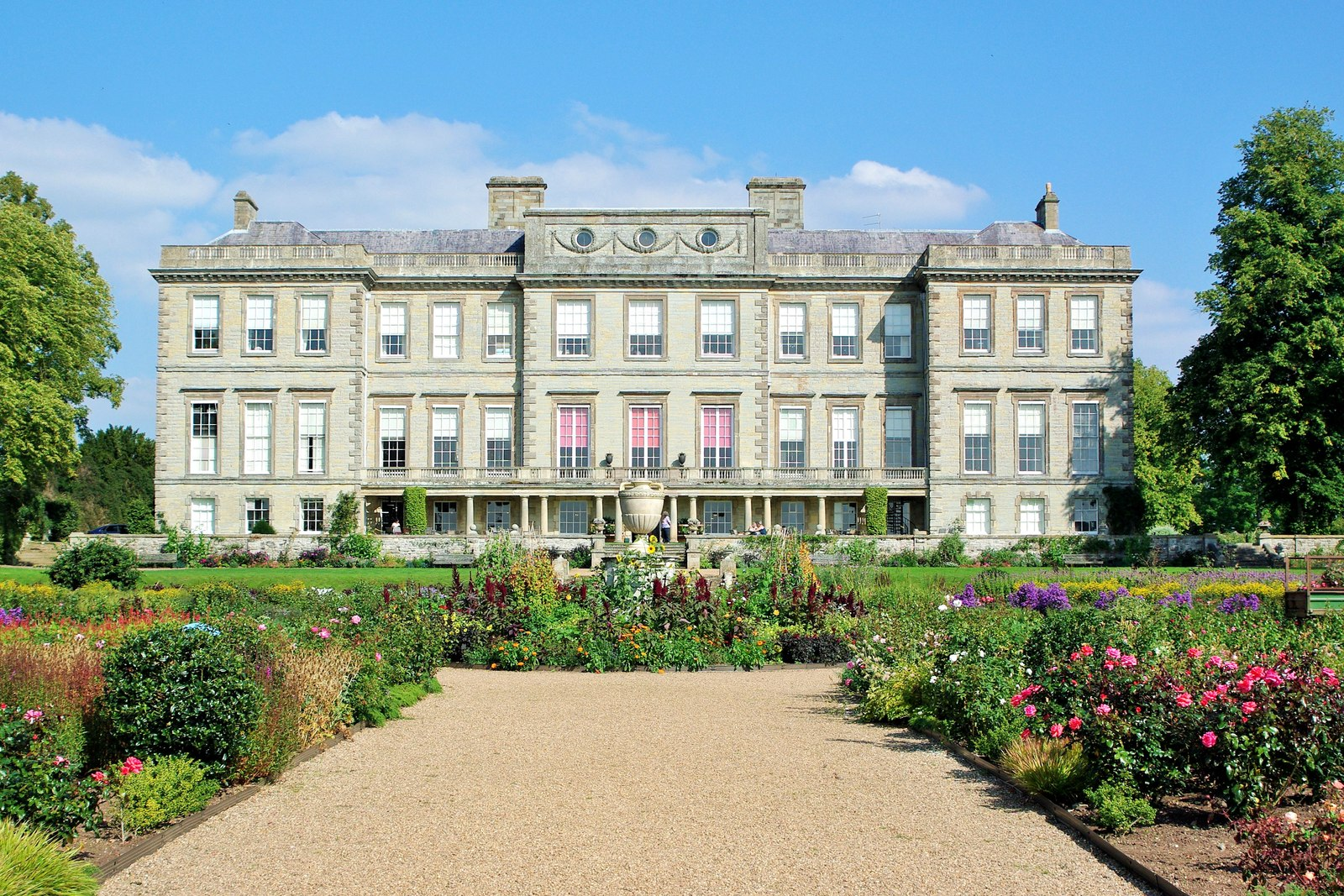
Ragley Hall, Warwickshire.

Seymour was the eldest son of Admiral Sir George Seymour by his wife Georgiana Mary Berkeley, daughter of Sir George Berkeley; he was the elder brother of Henry Seymour and Lady Laura Seymour. He was the grandson of Lord Hugh Seymour and a great-grandson of Francis Seymour-Conway, 1st Marquess of Hertford, and it is through this line he succeeded to the Hertford marquessate when his second cousin, Richard Seymour-Conway, 4th Marquess of Hertford, died unmarried and without issue in 1870. He inherited the entailed property from the 4th Marquess, including Ragley Hall, whilst the unentailed property went to his second cousin's illegitimate son Richard Wallace, including what became the Wallace Collection.

He was educated at Harrow.

== Career ==
Seymour joined the Scots Fusilier Guards as a lieutenant in July 1827, rising to the rank of general in 1876 and retiring in 1881.

He was Groom of the Robes to William IV and Victoria between 1833 and 1870. In 1874 Seymour, now Lord Hertford, was sworn of the Privy Council and appointed Lord Chamberlain of the Household under Benjamin Disraeli, a post he held until 1879. Just before his retirement he was appointed a Knight Grand Cross of the Order of the Bath.

== Family ==
Lord Hertford married, on 9 May 1839, Lady Emily Murray (1816–1902), daughter of David William Murray, 3rd Earl of Mansfield and Frederica Markham. They had ten children:

- Frederica Georgina Seymour (c. 1841–1848), died young.
- Lady Horatia Elizabeth Seymour (1842–1922), married Sir David Erskine, a direct descendant of the Earls of Mar and had issue, including Arthur Erskine.
- Hugh de Grey Seymour, 6th Marquess of Hertford (1843–1912)
- Lady Florence Catherine Seymour (1845–1921), married Rev. James Blunt.
- Lord Albert Charles Seymour (1847–1891), married Sarah Napier and had issue.
- Lady Georgina Emily Lucy Seymour (1848–1944), married Henry Stirling-Home-Drummond, maternal grandson of Charles Douglas, 6th Marquess of Queensberry.
- Lord Ernest James Seymour (1850–1930), married Lady Georgiana Fortescue, daughter of Hugh Fortescue, 3rd Earl Fortescue and had issue.
- Lady Constance Adelaide Seymour (1852–1915), married Frederick St John Newdigate Barne and had issue, including Michael Barne.
- Lady Mary Margaret Seymour (1855–1948), married Sir George Dashwood, 6th Baronet and had issue. They were the paternal grandparents of Rosamund Dashwood.
- Reverend Lord Victor Alexander Seymour (1859–1935), married Elizabeth Cator and had issue.

His brother-in-law was Prince Victor of Hohenlohe-Langenburg, a nephew of Queen Victoria and a famous sculptor, who had married his sister Laura Williamina Seymour (later Princess Victor of Hohenlohe-Langenburg).

Lord Hertford died on 25 January 1884, aged 71, from injuries following a fall from a horse at Ragley Hall. He was succeeded in the marquessate by his eldest son, Hugh. The Dowager Marchioness of Hertford died at Westcott, Surrey, on 24 June 1902, aged 86.

Court offices
Preceded by Lord Adolphus FitzClarence	Groom of the Robes; 1833–1870	Succeeded by David Erskine
Political offices
Preceded by The Viscount Sydney	Lord Chamberlain; 1874–1879	Succeeded by The Earl of Mount Edgcumbe
Peerage of Great Britain
Preceded by Richard Seymour-Conway	Marquess of Hertford; 1870–1884	Succeeded by Hugh Seymour
