= Emily Seymour, Marchioness of Hertford =

Emily Seymour, Marchioness of Hertford (née Lady Emily Mary Murray; 22 November 1816 – 24 June 1902) was the wife of Francis Seymour, 5th Marquess of Hertford.

== Early life ==
She was the daughter of David William Murray, 3rd Earl of Mansfield, and his wife, the former Frederica Markham.

== Personal life ==
She married the marquess in London on 9 May 1839, more than thirty years before he inherited the title from his cousin, Richard Seymour-Conway, 4th Marquess of Hertford, who died without direct heirs. The couple had ten children:

- Frederica Georgina Seymour (1840–1848), who died in childhood
- Lady Horatia Elizabeth Seymour (1842–1922), who married Sir David Erskine, a direct descendant of the Earls of Mar and had children
- Hugh de Grey Seymour, 6th Marquess of Hertford (1843–1912)
- Lady Florence Catherine Seymour (1845–1921), who married Rev. James Blunt and had no children
- Lord Albert Charles Seymour (1847–1891), who married Sarah Napier and had children
- Georgina Emily Lucy Seymour (1848–1944), who married Henry Stirling-Home-Drummond, a maternal grandson of Charles Douglas, 6th Marquess of Queensberry, and had no children
- Lord Ernest James Seymour (1850–1930), who married Lady Georgiana Fortescue, daughter of Hugh Fortescue, 3rd Earl Fortescue and had children
- Lady Constance Adelaide Seymour (1852–1915), who married Frederick St John Newdigate Barne, MP, and had children, including the explorer Michael Barne.
- Lady Mary Margaret Seymour (1855–1948), who married Sir George Dashwood, 6th Baronet, and had children
- Reverend Lord Victor Alexander Seymour (1859–1935), who married Elizabeth Cator and had children

The marquess died in 1884, aged 71, as a result of a fall from a horse at the family home of Ragley Hall in Warwickshire. He was succeeded in the marquessate by his eldest son, and his widow became known as Dowager Marchioness of Hertford. She died at Brooklands Manor, Westcott, Surrey, aged 86.
