= George Markham (priest) =

English cleric, Dean of York

George Markham (30 March 1763 – 30 September 1822) served as Dean of York from 1802 and Rector of Stokesley until his death.

== Life ==
He was born into a large clerical family, the third son of William Markham, Archbishop of York from 1776 to 1807; his brother John Markham was a noted Naval officer, and one of his sisters was Frederica Murray, Countess of Mansfield. He received his education at Westminster School. He matriculated at Christ Church, Oxford in 1780, graduating B.A. in 1784 and M.A. in 1787.

Markham served as Rector of Tattenhall, then as Prebendary of Bilton before becoming Dean of York.

== Marriage and family ==
Markham's Divorce Act 1803
- Act of Parliament
- Parliament of the United Kingdom
- Long title: An Act to dissolve the Marriage of the Reverend Markham Dean of York, with Elizabeth Evelyn Sutton his now Wife, and to enable him to marry again, and for other Purposes therein mentioned.
- Citation: 43 Geo. 3. c. 76 Pr.

Dates
- Royal assent: 11 June 1803

He married Elizabeth Evelyn, daughter of Sir Richard Sutton, of Norwood in 1789: the marriage was to end in divorce in 1803, authorised by the Markham's Divorce Act 1803 (43 Geo. 3. c. 76 Pr.). Of their children:

- The eldest daughter, Elizabeth Frances, married Rufane Shaw Donkin. She died in Meerut in 1818, at age 28, and he named Port Elizabeth in South Africa after her.
- Their daughter Maria married Rev. (Thomas) Alfred Harris, son of James Harris, 1st Earl of Malmesbury.

=== Divorce aftermath ===
After the divorce, Elizabeth Evelyn Markham was taken under the wing of her cousin Laura Pulteney, 1st Countess of Bath. She also inherited a substantial fortune when the Countess died in 1808. She married her lover John Fawcett, adultery with whom was the basis of the divorce, and he took the surname Pulteney. There were two sons and four daughters of this marriage.

John Fawcett (1766/7–1849) was a Christ Church, Oxford graduate, the son of Richard Fawcett of Grendon. His change of surname to Pulteney was by royal licence, in 1813. The couple had a son, John Apsley Pulteney of the 12th Lancers (1805/6–1840). Their eldest daughter Henrietta Laura Pulteney (1804–1898) married in 1832 the Rev. Philip Gurdon, and was mother of General Evelyn Pulteney Gurdon.

As Elizabeth Evelyn Sutton, she was known as a landscape artist.

Church of England titles
| Preceded by John Fountayne | Dean of York; 1802–1822 | Succeeded by William Cockburn |
