= James Hamilton Stanhope =

British Army officer (1788–1825)

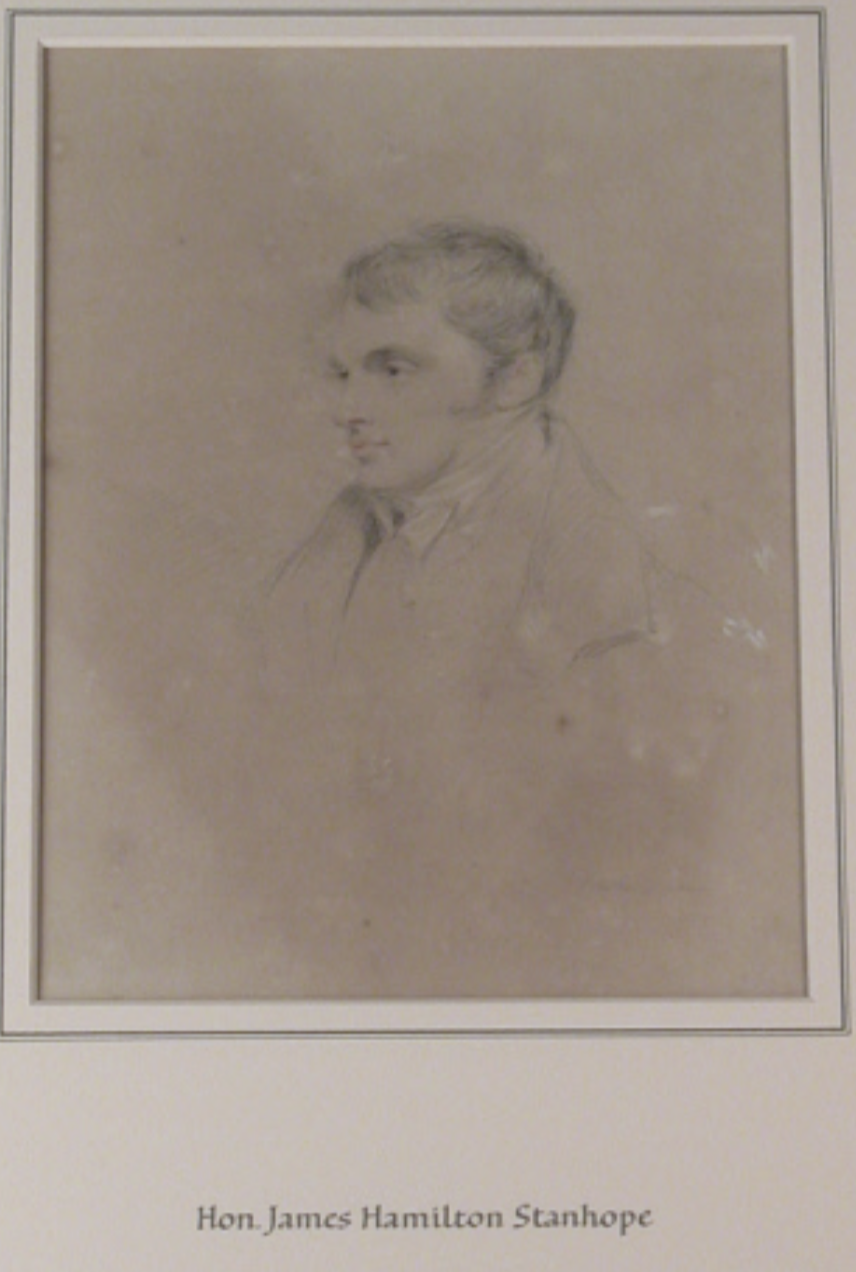
The Hon. James Hamilton Stanhope

James Hamilton Stanhope (1788 – 5 March 1825) was a British Army officer who fought in the Peninsular War and at the Battle of Waterloo. He was a Member of Parliament for Buckingham, 1817–1818, Fowey, 1818–1819, and Dartmouth, 1822–1825.

== Biography ==
Born 1788, Stanhope was the third and youngest son of Charles Stanhope, 3rd Earl Stanhope and Louisa Grenville, niece of 2nd Earl Temple. He was the brother of Philip Stanhope and half-brother to Lady Hester Stanhope. He was raised at the family seat Chevening with his five siblings.

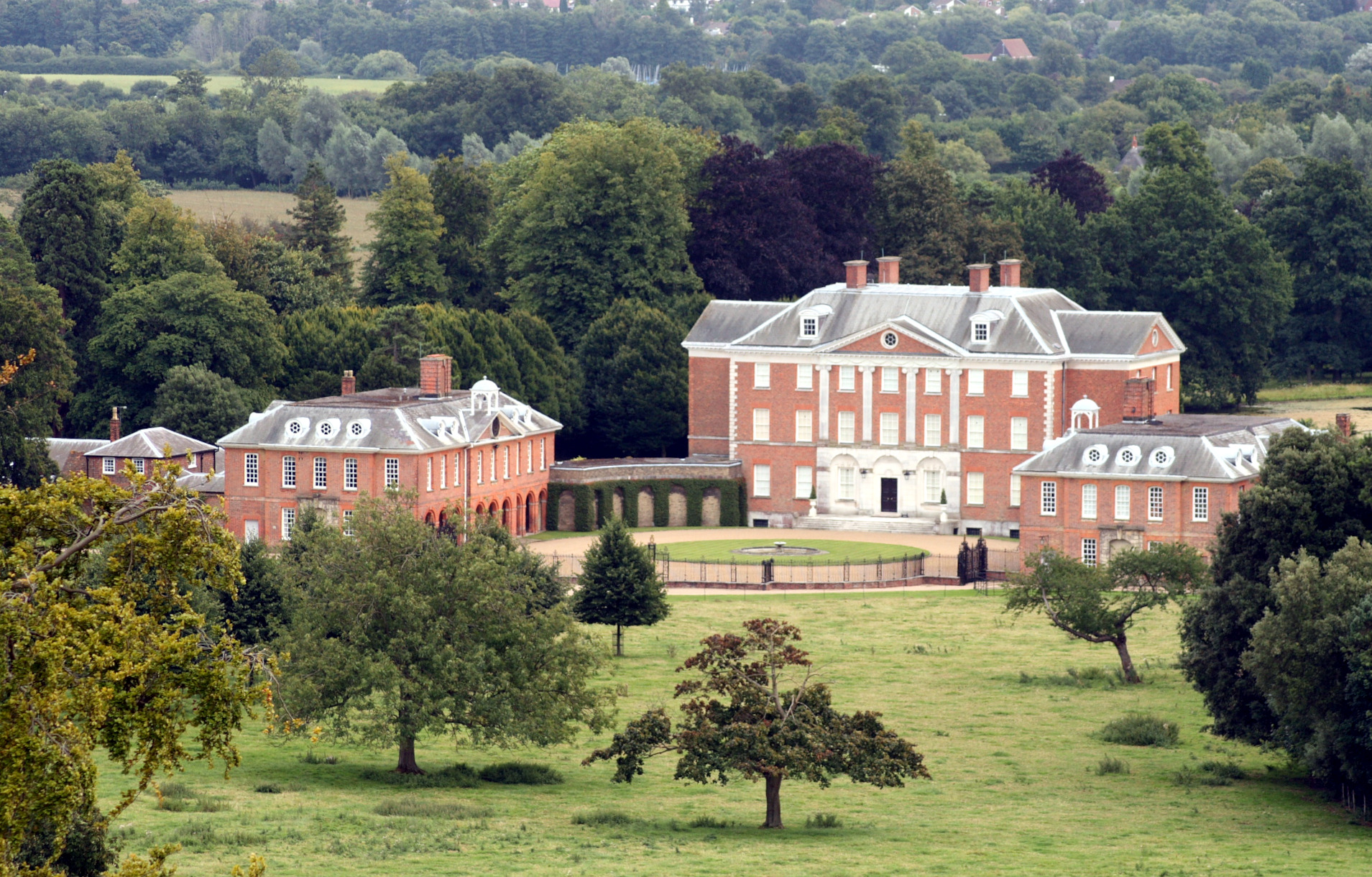
Chevening, Kent

Stanhope was joined in the British Army at the age of 15, contrary to his father's wishes, but by the advice and influence of William Pitt the Younger; who was 3rd Earl's second cousin, by the marriage of his grandfather, the 1st Earl, to Lucy, sister of Robert Pitt of Boconnock (the Minister's grandfather). (Note: How Earl Stanhope ended his friendship with the Minister from political motives, to the disunion of his own family, is documented in a Memoir of the Earl, Gentlemen Magazine, vol. 86, p. 563.) He entered the British Army as Ensign in the 1st Foot Guards, 26 December 1805; was promoted Lieutenant and Captain, 14 January 1808; brevet Major, 21 June 1813; and Captain and Lieutenant-Colonel in the 1st Foot Guards, 25 July 1814.

Stanhope served in Spain, Portugal, Flanders and France. He served as on the staff of General Sir John Moore as an aide-de-camp in 1809. He acted as extra aid-de-camp to Lord Lynedoch (1810–1814). In 1812, was appointed a Deputy Assistant Quarter Master General, and in 1813 as Assistant Quarter Master General in the Peninsula.

During the Siege of San Sebastián in late August and early September 1813, Stanhope received a grape-shot wound in the spine. The opinion of the surgeons by whom he was attended, was that the ball could not, without imminent risk of fatal consequences, be extracted, so it remained lodged in place and caused him immense suffering for the rest of his life. (Note: Whether by the pressure of an extraneous substance, or by direct lesion of the nerves themselves during the passage of the ball, the result was, that not only the spine was morbidly affected, but the whole nervous system partook of the injury, and frequent ex-foliations of the bone occurred.) He remained in the army and in 1815 served as an assistant adjacent to Duke of Wellington during the Waterloo Campaign and took part in the Battle of Waterloo and the subsequent the march upon Paris. From 1815 until he died he was aid-de-camp to Prince Frederick.

Stanhope was first elected to parliament in 1817; he was returned for Fowey at the general election in 1818, but was not re-chosen in 1820. In that year, by the will of Joseph Banks (his first cousin once-removed), he was appointed one of his four executors. Stanhope re-entered the House of Commons in early in 1822 as M.P. for Dartmouth, and continued so until his death.

== Marriage and death ==
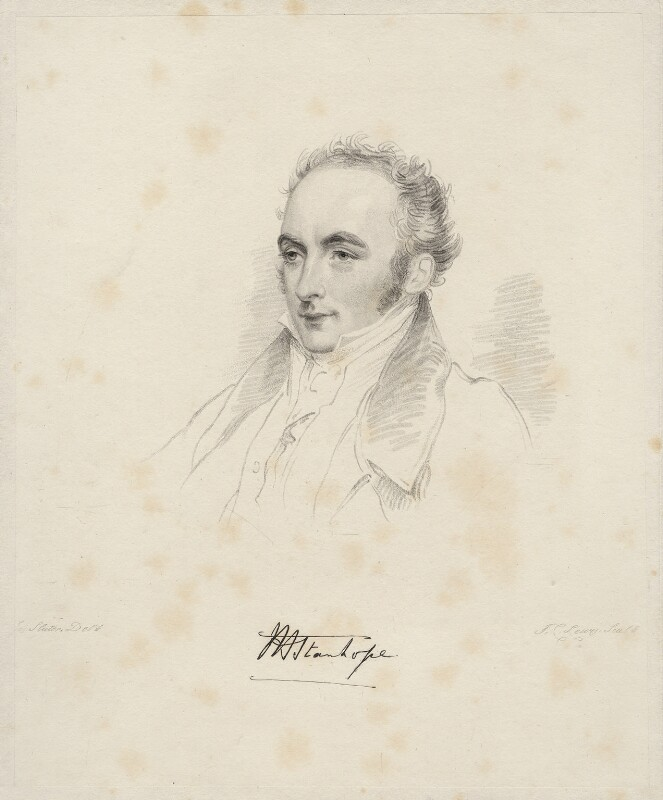
The Hon. James Hamilton Stanhope after Joseph Staler.

On 9 July 1820, Stanhope married Lady Frederica Louisa Murray, eldest daughter of David William Murray, 3rd Earl Mansfield and Frederica Markham at Kenwood House, performed by her uncle Robert Markham, Archdeacon of York. His wife gave birth to one son named James Stanhope in 1821, but she died on 14 January 1823. He built a large tomb and monument for her at Chevening Church by Sir Francis Chantrey at the cost of 1500 guineas.

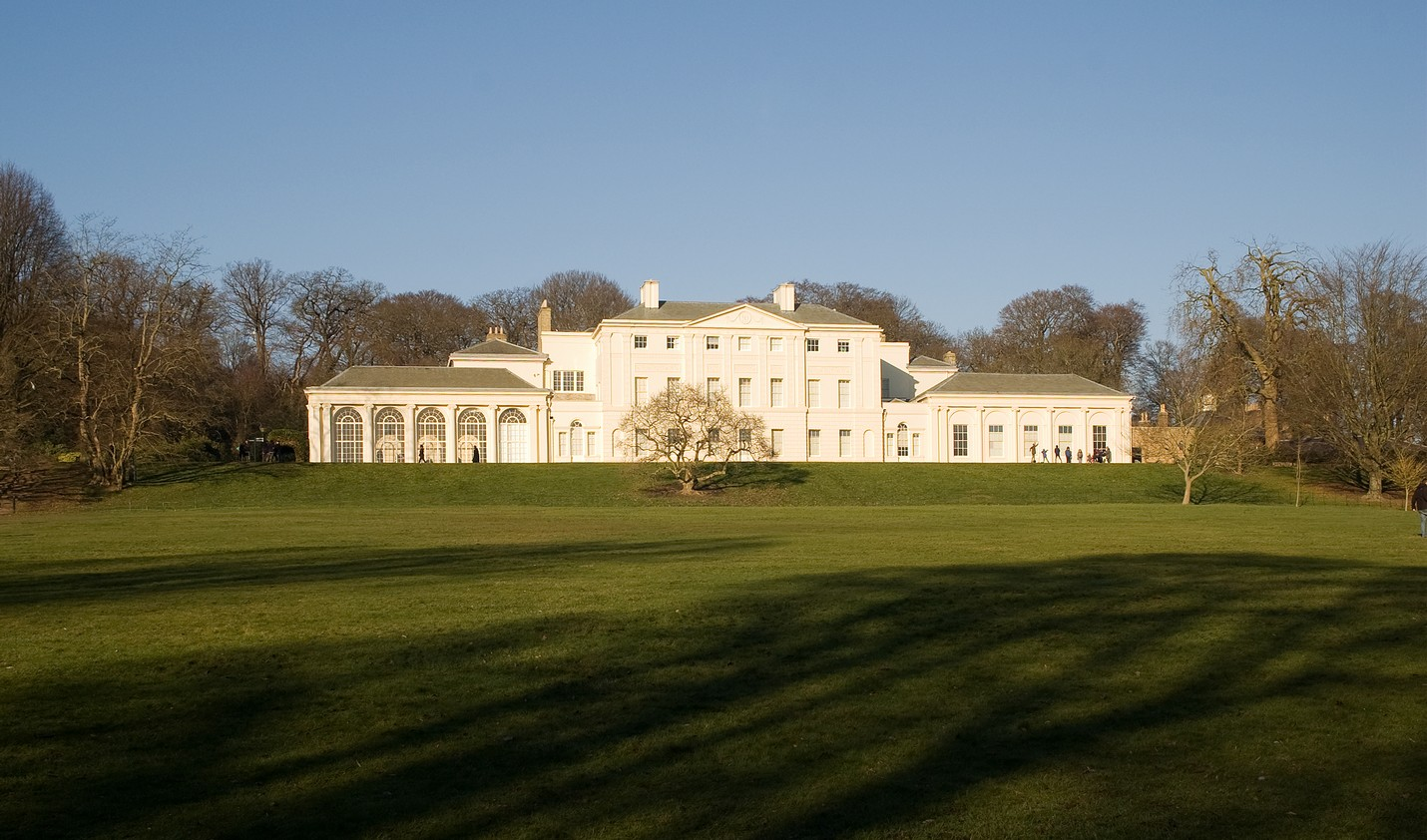
Kenwood House, Hampstead, London.

Greatly afflicted at the death of his wife Stanhope gave up his establishment in South Audley Street in London and moved into Kenwood House, the seat of his father-in-law. In 1825, Stanhope was still very depressed over the loss of his wife and continued to suffer physical discomfort from the wound he had received in Spain twelve years earlier. He had appeared very abstracted, and was in the habit of sitting a long time, as if in a state of stupor, and then he would suddenly start up, as if from sleep or upon an alarm.

A few days before his death by suicide on 5 March 1825, aged 36 or 37, he had complained very much that he could get no sleep, in consequence of the pain he endured. Afflicted in his melancholy manner, whilst walking in the park at some distance from the house, he entered a shed, formed to shelter the cattle, and suspended himself with his braces from a beam.

When he had missed Dinner, his father in law Lord Mansfield thought that he had some business in town, but he felt uneasy and ordered the carriage to town, his lordship made enquiries at every place he might visit to no avail, then the household being alarmed, and a general search by Lord Mansfield was carried out and then an under gardener said that he saw his son in law walking to the direction of the wood where the shed was, in which they then discovered his body some hours after. A Coroner's jury gave a verdict of "temporary insanity".

In his will, he requested simple burial with his wife and child, he also left some bequest to his half-sisters, he left £1500 a year to Lady Hester Stanhope, £500 a year to Lady Griselda, and £10,000 to Lady Lucy's child, and the remainder of his estate to his son, James Banks Stanhope.

== Bibliography ==
- Glover, Gareth, ed. (2008). Staff Officer in the Peninsula and at Waterloo: The Letters of the Honourable Lieutenant Colonel James H Stanhope 1st Foot Guards 1809–15. Ken Trotman Publishing. ISBN 978-1905074679.
- Guscin, Mark (2021). The Life of James Hamilton Stanhope (1788-1825) Love, War and Tragedy.
