= William Markham (bishop) =

Archbishop of York from 1777 to 1807

The Most Reverend and Right Honourable William Markham
- Archbishop of York
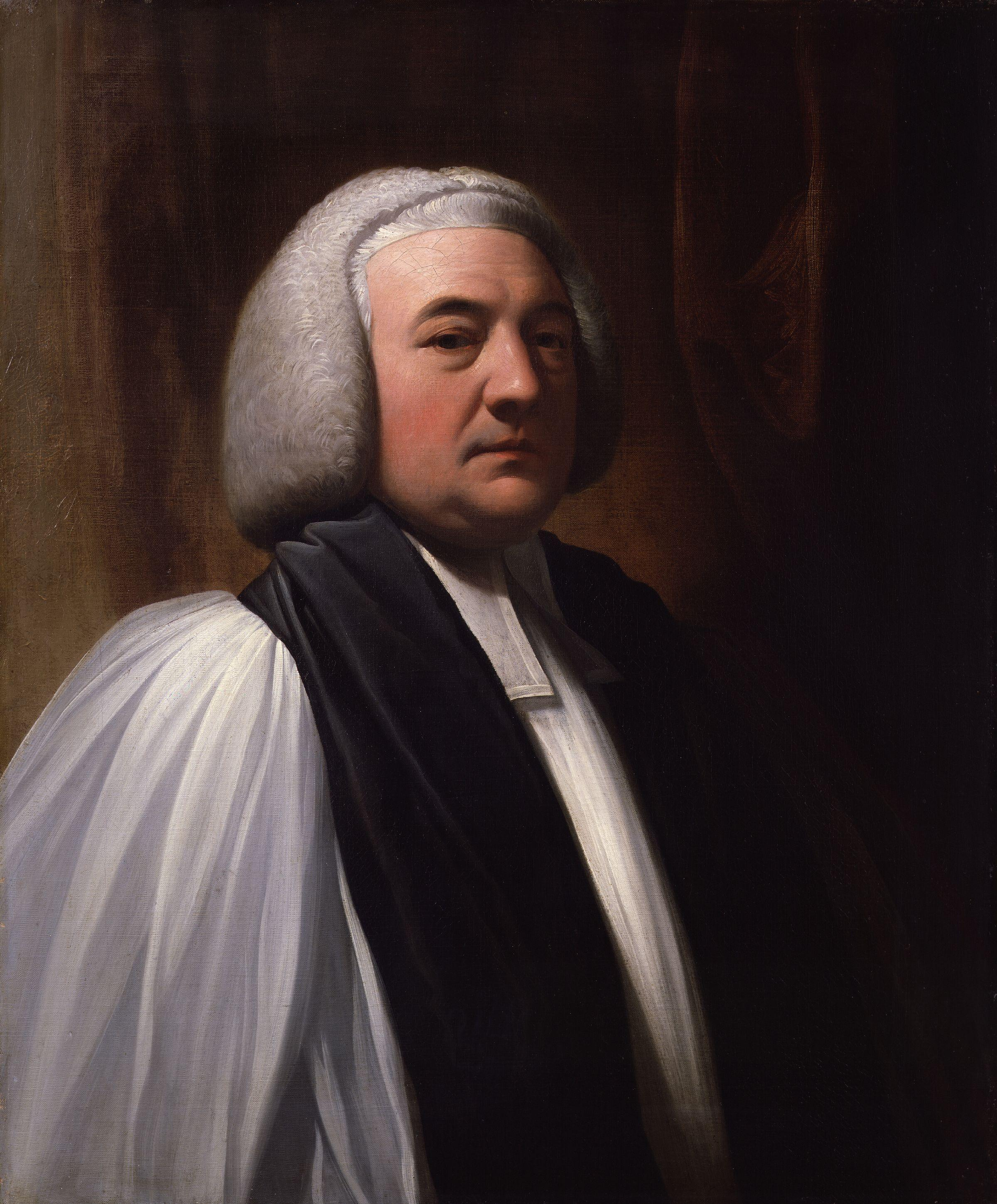
- Contemporary portrait by Benjamin West.
- Province: Province of York
- Diocese: Diocese of York
- In office: 17 January 1777 (conf.)–1807 (death)
- Predecessor: Robert Hay Drummond
- Successor: Edward Venables-Vernon-Harcourt
- Other posts: Lord High Almoner (1777–1807); Dean of Rochester (20 February 1765 {instit.}–October 1767); Dean of Christ Church (October 1767 {exch.}–1777); Bishop of Chester (February 1771 {conf.}–1777)

Personal details
- Born: 1719 Kinsale, County Cork, Ireland
- Died: 3 November 1807 (aged 88) Mayfair, Middlesex, England
- Buried: 11 November 1807, Westminster Abbey
- Denomination: Anglican
- Residence: South Audley Street, Mayfair (at death)
- Parents: Major William Markham & Elizabeth née Markham
- Spouse: Sarah Goddard (m. 1759)
- Children: 6 sons & 7 daughters
- Education: Westminster School
- Alma mater: Christ Church, Oxford

Ordination history of William Markham
History
Priestly ordination
- Ordained by: Thomas Secker (Oxford)
- Date: 17 December 1748
- Place: Christ Church Cathedral, Oxford
Episcopal consecration
- Consecrated by: Robert Hay Drummond (York)
- Date: 17 February 1771
- Place: Chapel Royal, St James's Palace

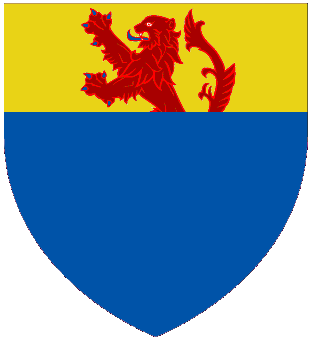
Arms: Azure on a chief Or a lion issuant Gules.

William Markham (1719 – 3 November 1807), English divine, served as Archbishop of York from 1777 until his death.

== Early life ==
William Markham was born in 1719 to Major William Markham and Elizabeth (née Markham) of Kinsale in Ireland.

He was educated at Westminster School and at Christ Church, Oxford, where he matriculated on 6 June 1738, graduating BA 1742, MA 1745, BCL & DCL 1752.

== Career ==
He was one of the best scholars of his day, and attained to the headship of his old school and college: he served as Headmaster of Westminster 1753–1765, and Dean of Christ Church 1767–1776. Between those headships, he held the deanery of Rochester 1765–1767. He held from time to time a number of livings, and in 1771 was made Bishop of Chester and tutor to George, Prince of Wales. In 1776 he became Archbishop of York, and also Lord High Almoner and privy councillor.

He was a fierce critic of pamphleteer Richard Price concerning the American rebellion. He was for some time a close friend of Edmund Burke, but his strong championship of Warren Hastings caused a breach. He was accused by Lord Chatham of preaching pernicious doctrines, and was a victim of the Gordon Riots in 1780.

Bishop Markham was also the person who composed the Latin memorial for George Berkeley, the famous philosopher.

== Personal life ==
In 1759, Markham married Sarah Goddard, the daughter of John Goddard, a wealthy English merchant of Rotterdam, with whom he had six sons and seven daughters:

- William Markham (1760–1815), of the East India Company, Private Secretary to Governor-General Warren Hastings
- John Markham (1761–1827), Admiral of the Royal Navy, First Sea Lord
- George Markham (1763–1822), Dean of York
- Henrietta Sarah Markham (1764–1844), married Ewan Law MP
- Elizabeth Catherine Markham (1765–1820), married William Barnett (as his second wife)
- David Markham (1766–1795), Lieutenant-Colonel of the 20th Regiment of Foot, killed in the Second Maroon War in Jamaica
- Robert Markham (1768–1837), Archdeacon of York
- Osborne Markham (1769–1827), MP for Calne
- Alicia Henrietta Markham (1771–1840), married Rev. Henry Foster Mills
- Georgina Markham (1772–1793), died unmarried
- Frederica Markham (1774–1860), married David William Murray, 3rd Earl of Mansfield
- Anne Katherine Markham (1778–1808), died unmarried
- Cecilia Markham (1783–1865), married Rev. Robert Philip Goodenough

=== Descendants ===
His granddaughter, Laura Markham, the second daughter of his son William, married William Mure, the Scottish scholar and politician who sat in the Parliament of the United Kingdom from 1846 to 1855 as the Conservative MP for Renfrewshire and was Laird of Caldwell in Ayrshire. Their daughter, Emma Mure, (1833–1911) married Thomas Lister, 3rd Baron Ribblesdale (1828–1876) and had Thomas Lister, 4th Baron Ribblesdale.

His granddaughter, Emma Markham, another daughter of his son William, married the politician William Crompton-Stansfield who sat in the Parliament of the United Kingdom from 1837 to 1853 as Whig Member of Parliament (MP) for Huddersfield.

=== Memorial ===
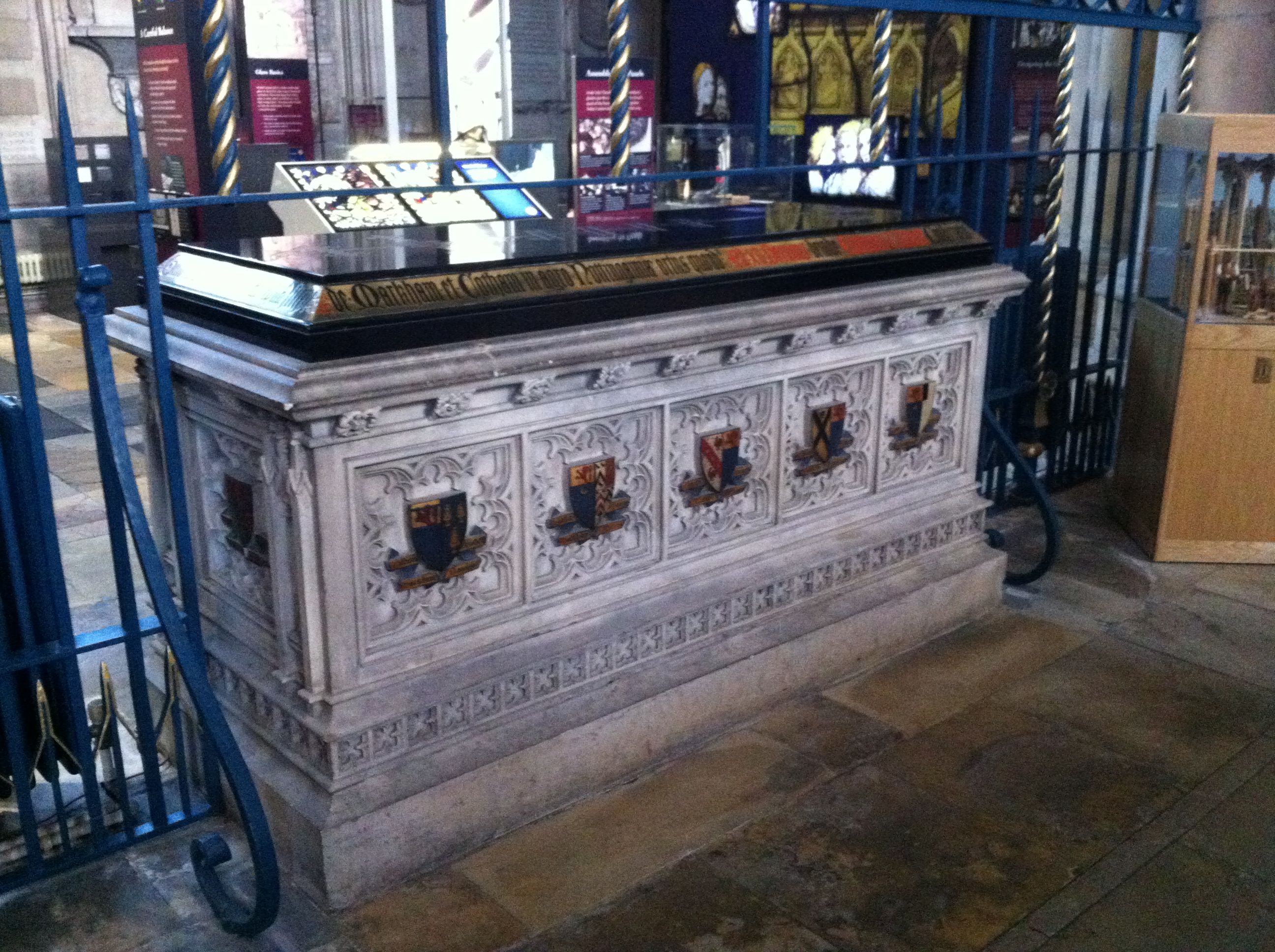
Memorial to Archbishop William Markham in York Minster.

== See also ==
- Markham, Ontario – named for him by his friend John Graves Simcoe, Lieutenant Governor of Upper Canada.

== Footnotes ==
Church of England titles
Preceded by Edmund Keene	Bishop of Chester; 1771–1776	Succeeded by Beilby Porteus
Preceded by Robert Hay Drummond	Archbishop of York; 1776–1807	Succeeded by Edward Venables-Vernon-Harcourt
