= Walter Erskine, Earl of Mar and Kellie (1865–1955) =

British noble

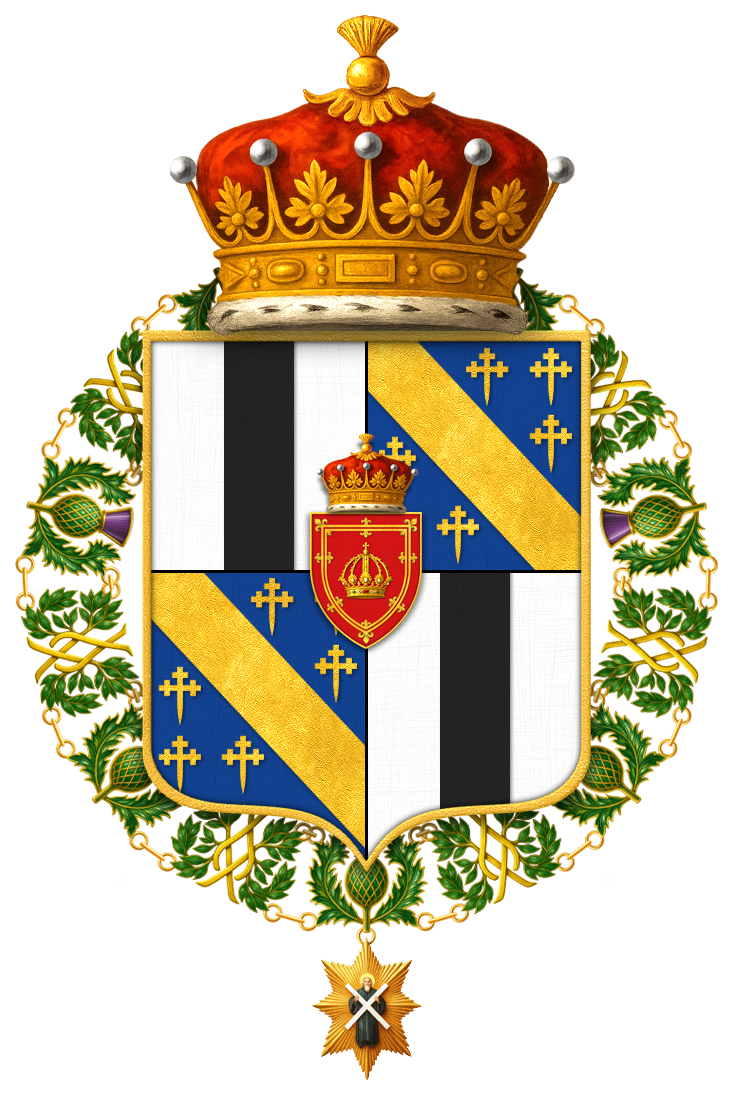
Shield of Arms of Walter John Francis Erskine, 12th Earl of Mar and 14th Earl of Kellie, KT, JP

Walter John Francis Erskine, 12th Earl of Mar and 14th Earl of Kellie KT JP (29 August 1865 – 3 June 1955) was a Scottish nobleman.

== Biography ==
The eldest son of Walter Erskine, 11th Earl of Mar and Mary Anne Forbes, he was educated at Eton and served as a 2nd lieutenant and then lieutenant in the Scots Guards from 1887–92.

He succeeded his father in 1888, and in 1892 married Lady Violet Ashley-Cooper, daughter of Anthony Ashley-Cooper, 8th Earl of Shaftesbury. They had three children:

- Elyne Violet Erskine (born-died 2 August 1893)
- Major John Francis Ashley Erskine, Lord Erskine (26 April 1895 – 3 May 1953)
- Captain Hon. Francis Walter Erskine (9 January 1899 – 1972)

He was a Scottish Representative Peer from 1892–1950, and held office as Lord Lieutenant of Clackmannanshire from 1898 and Lord Clerk Register and Keeper of the Signet from 1936–44. He was also Hereditary Keeper of Stirling Castle, and Honorary Colonel of the 7th Battalion Argyll and Sutherland Highlanders. He was successively Brigadier, Ensign, Lieutenant, and Captain in the Royal Company of Archers.

He was appointed a Knight of the Thistle in the 1911 Coronation Honours and was Chancellor of the Order from 1932–49. His son, John, having predeceased him, he was succeeded by his grandson, John Erskine, Earl of Mar and Kellie (1921-1993).

Political offices
Preceded by The Duke of Buccleuch	Lord Clerk Register; 1936–1944	Succeeded by Lord Elphinstone
Honorary titles
Preceded by The Earl of Mansfield and Mansfield	Lord Lieutenant of Clackmannanshire; 1898–1955	Succeeded by James Paton Younger
Preceded by The Duke of Roxburghe	Chancellor of the Order of the Thistle; 1932–1949	Succeeded by Lord Elphinstone
Peerage of Scotland
Preceded by Walter Erskine	Earl of Mar; Earl of Kellie; 1888–1955	Succeeded by John Erskine
