= Robert Markham (priest) =

Robert Markham (14 June 1768 – 17 June 1837) was an English churchman, Archdeacon of York from 1794 until his death.

The son of Archbishop William Markham, he was educated at Christ Church, Oxford. He held livings at Barton in Fabis, Bishopthorpe and Bolton Percy. Markham's library was sold at auction by R. H. Evans in London on 26 February 1838 (and three following days). A copy of the catalogue is held at Cambridge University Library (shelfmark Munby.c.144e(1)).
