= Pearne v Lisle =

1749 English legal case re enslaved Africans

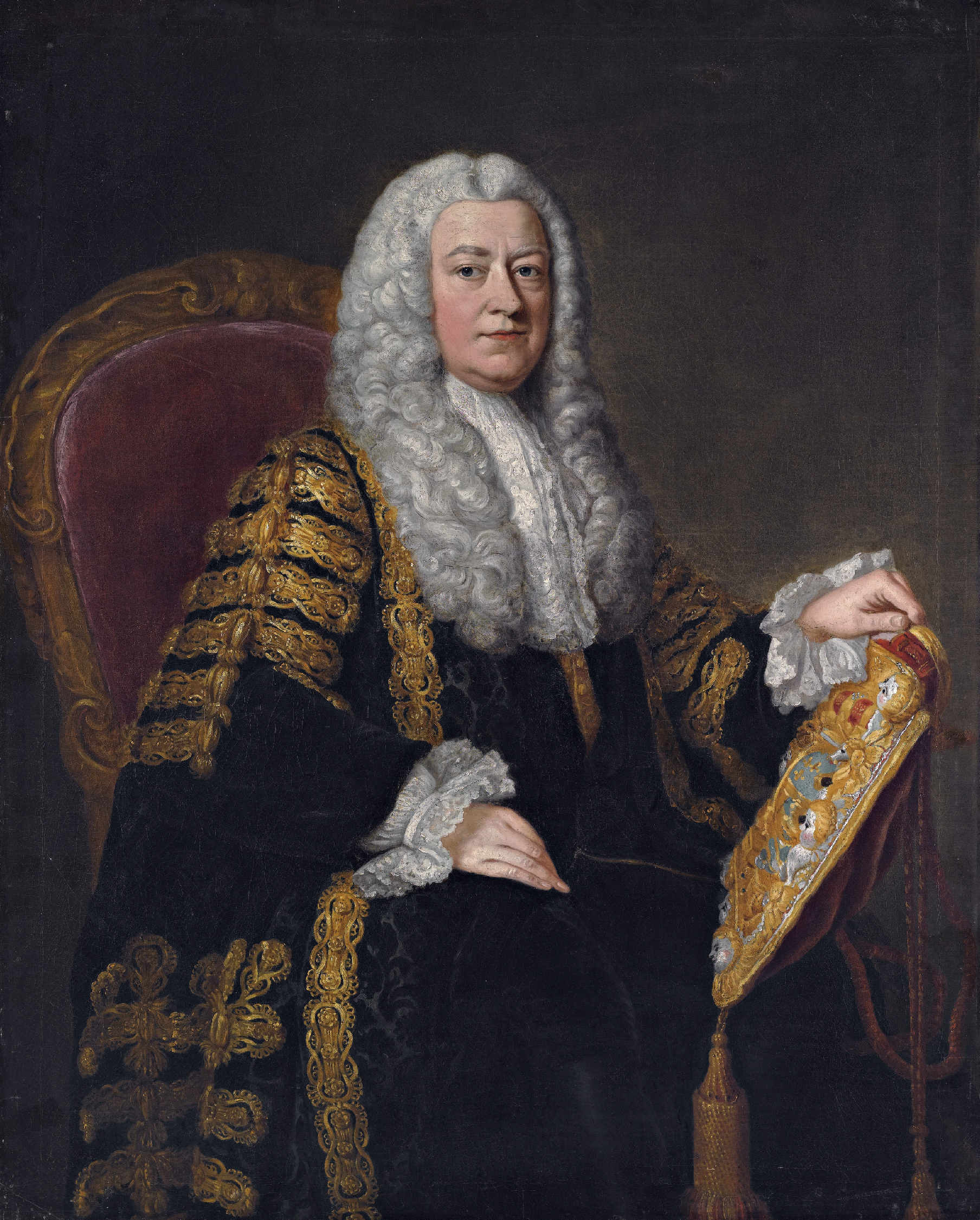
Philip Yorke, 1st Earl of Hardwicke by William Hoare

Pearne v Lisle (1749) Amb 75, 27 ER 47, was a significant English legal case concerning the status of enslaved Africans under English common law. Presided over by Lord Chancellor Hardwicke (formerly Philip Yorke), the case effectively established a strong judicial precedent that enslaved Black people were legal property (chattels) within the jurisdiction of England. The ruling directly contradicted earlier progressive decisions, such as Chief Justice Sir John Holt’s 1706 ruling in Smith v Gould, and served as the prevailing pro-slavery legal standard in Britain until it was successfully challenged in the landmark 1772 case, Somerset v Stewart.

== Background ==
The legal status of enslaved people within the British Isles was highly ambiguous during the late 17th and early 18th centuries. As the British Empire expanded its involvement in the transatlantic slave trade , the English courts struggled to reconcile the economic reality of colonial plantation slavery with traditional English common law, which generally did not recognize chattel slavery.

In 1569, it was ruled that English law could not recognize slavery . This sentiment was upheld in 1706 by Chief Justice Sir John Holt in Smith v Gould, where he decreed that "by the common law no man can have a property in another."

However, the growing reliance of the British economy on Caribbean sugar and tobacco generated immense pressure from colonial planters and merchants. In 1729, slave owners sought legal reassurance regarding the status of enslaved Africans brought to England. In response, Attorney General Philip Yorke and Solicitor General Charles Talbot issued the Yorke-Talbot opinion. This informal, after-dinner legal opinion stated that bringing an enslaved person to Great Britain did not make them free, nor did baptism alter their status as property.

== Facts of case ==
Twenty years after issuing the Yorke-Talbot opinion, Philip Yorke, now elevated to the position of Lord Chancellor Hardwicke, presided over the Court of Chancery in the case of Pearne v Lisle.

The immediate legal dispute did not center on an enslaved person actively seeking freedom in England. Rather, it was a commercial dispute over the title, rental, and ownership of fourteen enslaved people located in the Caribbean colony of Antigua . The case involved complex jurisdictional questions about colonial law and the appropriate legal action to recover the "value" of the enslaved individuals.

== The judgment ==
Lord Hardwicke utilized the case as an opportunity to cement his 1729 Yorke-Talbot opinion into formal legal precedent. He declared unequivocally that African slaves were legal chattels under English law.

Overturning the core principles established by Chief Justice Holt earlier in the century, Hardwicke ruled that an enslaved person "is as much property as any other thing." He argued that the legal action of trover—a common law action to recover the value of personal property that has been wrongfully disposed of by another person—could be maintained for an enslaved person, just as it could be for livestock or inanimate goods. Hardwicke firmly dismissed the notion that setting foot on English soil automatically conferred freedom upon an enslaved person.

== Legacy ==
Pearne v Lisle represented a devastating setback for early abolitionist efforts and stands as one of the most starkly pro-slavery rulings in the history of English common law

The precedent set by Pearne v Lisle dictated the legal landscape for over two decades. It was finally undermined by the 1772 Somerset v Stewart ruling, in which Lord Chief Justice Mansfield ruled that a slave could not be forcibly taken out of England against their will, dealing a critical blow to the legal foundation of slavery on English soil.

== See also ==
- Yorke-Talbot slavery opinion
