= History of African presence in London =

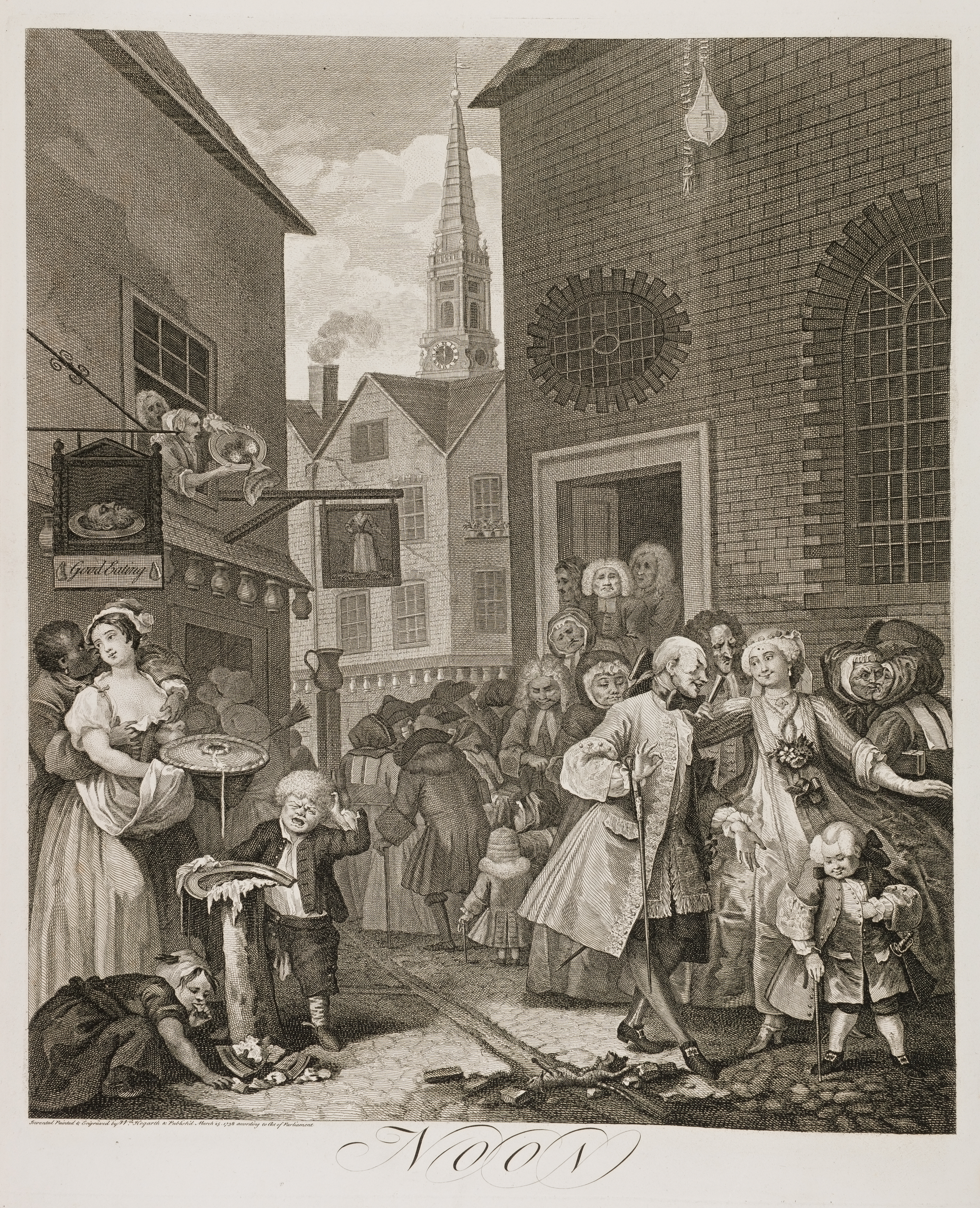
William Hogarth's print Four Times of the Day: Noon (1738) shows a black London resident at the far left of the artwork.

The history of African presence in London may extend back to the Roman period.

== Roman London ==
Using bioarchaeology, DNA analysis and the examination of grave goods in Roman London have identified one woman from the southern Mediterranean who may have had African ancestry who had travelled to London during the Roman period.

== 16th century ==
The population density of Africans in 16th-century London is poorly understood. Due to the proliferation of documentation in the Tudor and Stuart periods, we know that Africans were present in most of the noble courts of this century.

An African trumpeter, John Blanke served King Henry VII and King Henry VIII. Blanke is depicted on Westminster tournament roll in 1511, is said to have arrived in England with Catherine of Aragon in 1501, although a document from June 1488, lists a person named John Blank, a footman already in service of Henry VII. Documentation from the court of Queen Elizabeth I concerning the Baskerville campaign of 1595–96, documents a substantial number of Spanish and African prisoners of war captured in an assault by Sir Francis Drake on a Spanish pearl-fishing settlement in Rio de la Hacha in the Spanish West Indies during the Anglo-Spanish War. Later, she traded those prisoners for the return of English prisoners held in Spain and Portugal. Elizabeth also employed an African court dancer named Lucy Negro who later became an infamous madam who ran a licentious house (brothel) in Clerkenwell, north London and is considered one of the candidates to have been the inspiration for the Dark Lady of Shakespeare's sonnets.

Aside from presence within the courts, parish documentation also establishes that African people were embedded in all echelons of London society, Reasonable Blackman a silk weaver who likely emigrated from the Netherlands, lived in Southwark around 1579–1592. Mary Fillis, a daughter of a basket weaver from Morocco, came to London around 1583–84 and ended up a seamstress from East Smithfield. Prince Dederi Jaquoah, the son of King Caddi-biah who ruled of a kingdom in modern Liberia was baptised in London on New Year's Day 1611 and lived as a merchant.

== 17th–18th centuries ==
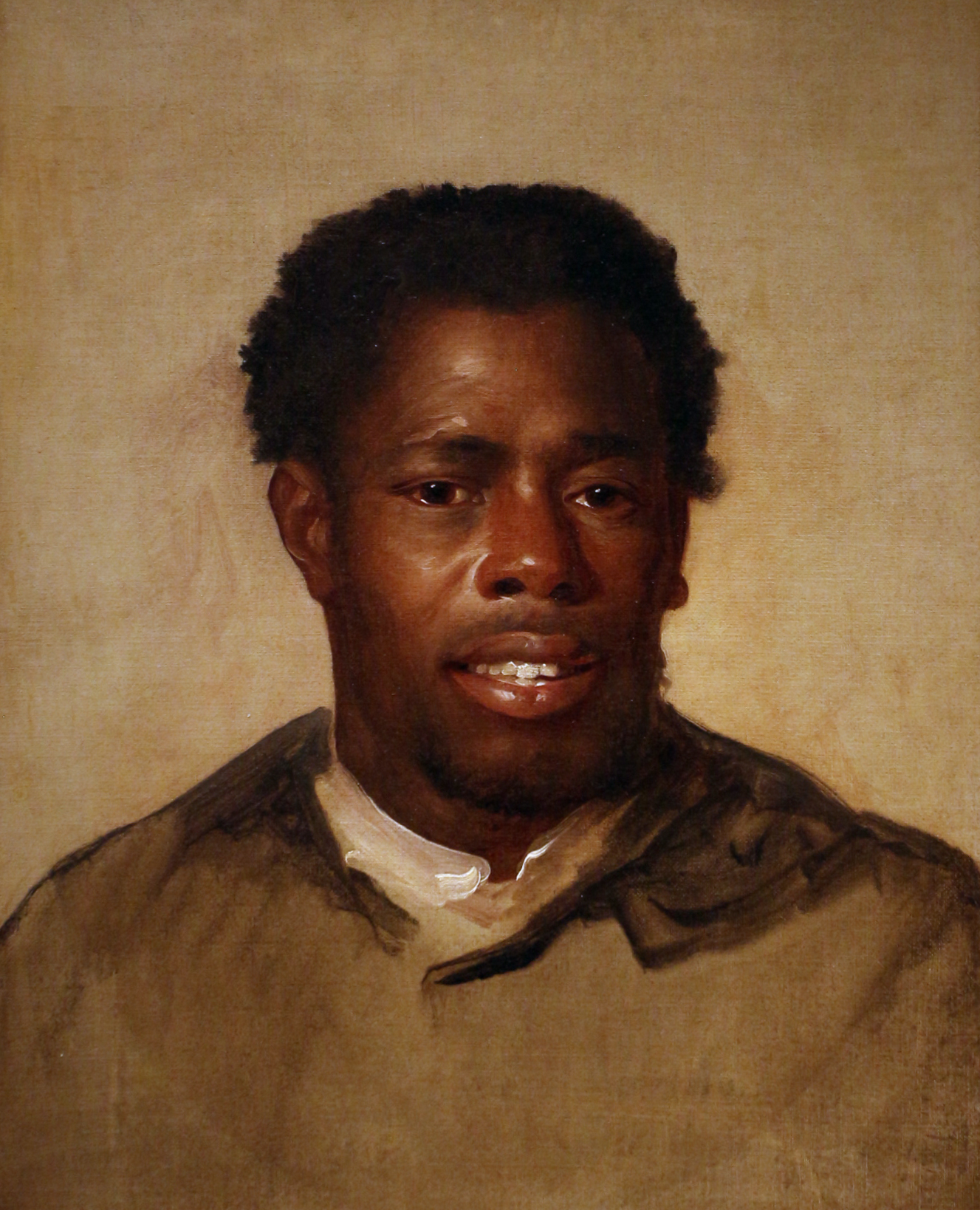
Possible portrait of a Black London dockworker by John Singleton Copley made c. 1777

By the middle of the eighteenth century, African people comprised somewhere between one and three percent of the London populace. British merchants had already become involved with the transatlantic slave trade between Europe, Africa and the Americas. Many of those involved in colonial activities, such as sea captains, colonial officials, merchants and planters brought Africans as servants back to London with them. This marked the growing black presence in the northern, eastern and southern areas of London. There were also small numbers of freed slaves and seamen from West Africa and South Asia. Many of these emigrants were forced into beggary due to the lack of jobs and their low social status.

In 1610, Prince Dederi Jaquoah was brought, aged 20, to the City of London from West Africa by an English merchant, and records state that he was "sent out of his cuntrye by his father ... to be baptised" and that he stayed in London for two years. In 1684, Katharine Auker was brought to England from Barbados by her enslaver, plantation owner Robert Rich. After Auker was baptised in 1688 at St Katharine by the Tower, she was made destitute by Rich. In 1690 she succeeded in a court petition to be freed from slavery. An official record of this is held in The National Archives. In 1737, black Briton George Scipio was accused of stealing Anne Godfrey's washing, with the case resting entirely on whether or not Scipio was the only black man in Hackney at the time.

Around the 1750s, London became the home of many African people, Jews, Irish people, Germans, and Huguenots. In 1764 The Gentleman's Magazine reported that there was "supposed to be near 20,000 Negroe servants." Evidence of the number of black residents in London has been found through registered burials. Leading African abolitionists of the period included Olaudah Equiano, Ignatius Sancho and Quobna Ottobah Cugoano. With the support of other Britons, these activists demanded that the slave trade and slavery be abolished. Supporters involved in this movement included workers and other emigrant nationals of the urban poor. At this time, slavery in Britain itself had no support from common law, but its definitive legal status was not clearly defined until the 19th century. Free African people could not be enslaved, but the legal status of Black people who were brought as slaves to Britain remained unclear. During this era Lord Mansfield declared that a slave who fled from his master could not be taken by force or sold abroad, in the case of Somerset v Stewart. This verdict fuelled the numbers of African people that escaped slavery, and helped send slavery into decline.

In this same period many formerly enslaved soldiers who fought on the side of the British in the American Revolutionary War arrived in London. Many of them became poverty-stricken and were reduced to begging on the streets. The black people in London lived among the whites in areas of Mile End, Stepney, Paddington, Isleworth and St Giles. The majority of these people worked as domestic servants to wealthy whites. Many became labeled as the "Black Poor" defined as former low-wage soldiers, seafarers and former plantation workers. During the late 18th century there were many publications and memoirs written about the "black poor". One example is the writings of Equiano, who became an unofficial spokesman for Britain's Black community. A memoir about his life is entitled, The Interesting Narrative of the Life of Olaudah Equiano. Equiano became a landowner in Cambridgeshire and married Susannah Cullen, from Soham. Both his daughters were born and baptised there. In 1787, 441 Black people emigrated from London for resettlement to the colony of Sierra Leone with help from the Committee for the Relief of the Black Poor. Today the descendants of the Black Poor form part of the Sierra Leone Creole people.

== 19th century ==
Coming into the early 19th century, more groups of black soldiers and seaman were discharged after the Napoleonic Wars and some settled in London. These emigrants suffered and faced many challenges as did many black people in London. The slave trade was abolished completely in the British Empire by 1833. The number of black people in London was steadily declining with these new laws. Fewer black people were brought into London from the West Indies and parts of Africa. During the mid-19th century there were restrictions on foreign immigration. In the later part of the 19th century there was a buildup of small groups of black dockside communities in towns such as Canning Town, Liverpool, and Cardiff. This was a direct effect of new shipping links that were established with the Caribbean and West Africa.

Despite facing social prejudice, some 19th-century black people living in England achieved exceptional success. Pablo Fanque, born poor as William Darby in Norwich, rose to become the proprietor of one of Britain's most successful circuses during the Victorian era. He is immortalised in the lyrics of The Beatles song "Being for the Benefit of Mr. Kite!" Another famous black Briton was William Davison, a conspirator executed for his role in the Cato Street Conspiracy against Lord Liverpool's government in 1820. Wales's first black high sheriff was Nathaniel Wells, the son of a slave from St Kitts and a Welsh slave trader. After his father's death he was freed and inherited a fortune. He moved to Monmouthshire's Piercefield House and became Sheriff of Monmouthshire in 1818. One of the leaders in 19th-century chartism was William Cuffay, who was born on a merchant ship in the West Indies in 1788, and whose father, had been a slave in St Kitts.

== 20th century ==
In 1909, the Sierra Leonese barrister and writer, Augustus Merriman-Labor published a travelogue where he wrote, "Negroes in London do not much exceed one hundred."

One black Londoner, Learie Constantine, a cricketer from Trinidad and welfare officer in the RAF, was refused service at the Imperial Hotel in London in July 1943. He stood up for his rights and later was awarded compensation. That particular example is used by some to illustrate the slow change towards acceptance and equality of all citizens in London.

=== Post-war period ===
In 1950, it was estimated there were no more than 20,000 non-White residents in the United Kingdom, mainly in England; almost all born overseas. Just after the end of World War II, the first groups of post-war Caribbean immigrants started to arrive and settle in London. There were an estimated 492 that were passengers on the HMT Empire Windrush that arrived at Tilbury Docks on 22 June 1948. These passengers settled in the area of Brixton which is now a prominently Black district in the UK. From the 1950s-60s, there was a mass migration of workers from all over the Anglophone Caribbean, particularly Jamaica; who settled in the UK. These immigrants were invited to fill labour requirements in London's hospitals, transport and railway development. There was a continuous influx of African students, sportsmen, and businessmen mixed within British society. They are viewed as having been a major contributing factor to the rebuilding of the post-war urban London economy.

In 1962, the Commonwealth Immigrants Act was passed in by the government, along with a succession of other laws in 1968, 1971, and 1981 that severely restricted the entry of Black Caribbean immigrants into the United Kingdom. In 1975, a new voice emerged for the Black population of London; his name was David Pitt and he brought a new voice to the House of Lords. He spoke against racism and for equality in regards to all residents of Britain. At the 1987 general election, the first-ever Black British MPs were elected to the House of Commons; Diane Abbott for Hackney North and Stoke Newington, Bernie Grant for Tottenham and Paul Boateng for Brent South. All were elected for seats in London and all were candidates for from the Labour Party. Out of these three people; Abbott was the first Black British woman to be elected to the House of Commons, and the only one out of these three candidates to remain a continuous sitting MP to the present day.

By the end of the 20th century, the number of Black Londoners numbered half a million, according to the 1991 UK census. An increasing number of these Black Londoners were London-born, or British-born. Even with this growing population and the first black members elected to the UK Parliament, many argue that there was still discrimination and a socio-economic imbalance in London amongst the Black community. In 1992, the number of Black members in Parliament doubled from three to six and in 1997, this was tripled from a decade previously to nine. There are still many problems that Black Londoners face; the new global and high-tech information revolution is changing the urban economy and some argue that it is driving unemployment rates among Blacks, higher relative to non-Blacks, something which, it is argued, threatens to erode the progress made thus far.

As of June 2007, the Black population of London was 802,300, equivalent to 10.6% of the population of London; 4.3% of Londoners are Caribbean, 5.5% of Londoners are African and a further 0.8% are from other black backgrounds including American and Latin American. There are also 117,400 people who are mixed black and white. At the 2011 UK census, the total Black population of London stood at 1,088,640 or 13.3% of the population.

== See also ==
- Historical immigration to Great Britain
- Black British
- Ethnic groups in London
