= Tumbling Lassie case =

The Tumbling Lassie case, formally Reid v Scot of Harden and his Lady ([1687] Mor 9505), was a 1687 case in the Court of Session, the highest civil court in the Kingdom of Scotland. It held that Scots law did not recognize chattel slavery, declaring "we have no slaves in Scotland, and mothers cannot sell their bairns". However, it was not widely publicised, and it was not until the later case of Knight v. Wedderburn in 1777-78 that this was widely accepted as the law in Scotland.

== The case ==
The case revolved around a "tumbling lassie", a child gymnast, who performed as part of a travelling show run by a mountebank called Reid. The girl, whose name and origins are not known, escaped from Reid and took shelter with the Scott family of Harden Castle in the Borders. Sir William Scott of Harden was a member of a prominent Border family, and had recently been pardoned after his part in Argyll's Rising in 1685. His wife, Jean Nisbet, was the daughter of John Nisbet, Lord Dirleton; the two had no children. "Doctor" Reid had arrived in Edinburgh in April 1686, with a royal license to perform, in company with another mountebank called Salvator Moscow. His troupe included at least one black servant, who was baptised as a Catholic along with Reid in January 1687.

Reid sued the Scotts for her return, arguing that he had paid 30 pounds Scots to her mother and now owned her. The court ruled in favour of the defender, with only the Lord Chancellor (James Drummond, 4th Earl of Perth) dissenting.

The case was recorded by Sir John Lauder, an advocate who later became a prominent judge. His summary is believed to represent a near-contemporaneous summary of the case, perhaps recorded the same day as the verdict was delivered.

Reid the mountebank pursues Scot of Harden and his Lady, for stealing away from him a little girl, called the tumbling-lassie, that danced upon his stage; and he claimed damages, and produced a contract, whereby he bought her from her mother for L. 30 Scots. But we have no slaves in Scotland, and mothers cannot sell their bairns; and physicians attested the employment of tumbling would kill her; and her joints were now grown stiff, and she declined to return; though she was at least a prentice, and so could not run away from her master; yet some cited Moses' law, that if a servant shelter himself with thee against his master's cruelty, thou shalt surely not deliver him up. The Lords renitenti Cancellario assoilzied Harden on the 27th of January.

As well as the clear position it took on slavery, the case is notable for being an early example of the use of medical expert witnesses, and for the way in which, unusually for the period, it avoided bringing in precedents from Roman law.

== The aftermath ==
While the court ruled that Scots law did not recognise slavery, it did not consider the situation of bonded colliers and salters, who could be placed into permanent bonded labour under Acts of Parliament dating from 1606 and 1661, and would not be fully emancipated until 1799.

The ruling may not have had a significant impact beyond the specific case. There was no systematic system of publishing court decisions in Scotland at the time, and one would not come until the early 19th century. Over the following years, the case was apparently forgotten, and slaves were brought to Scotland without any apparent change in legal status until the 1777-78 case of Joseph Knight. The Knight v Wedderburn ruling did not acknowledge or refer to the Tumbling Lassie case.

The case was adopted as the name of a campaign to raise funds to fight modern slavery in Scotland, the Tumbling Lassie Appeal, supported by the Faculty of Advocates and the Scottish Criminal Bar Association. In support of the appeal, the story was adapted into an operetta by Thomas Cunningham, with words by Alexander McCall Smith.
