= Yorke–Talbot slavery opinion =

1729 English judicial opinion

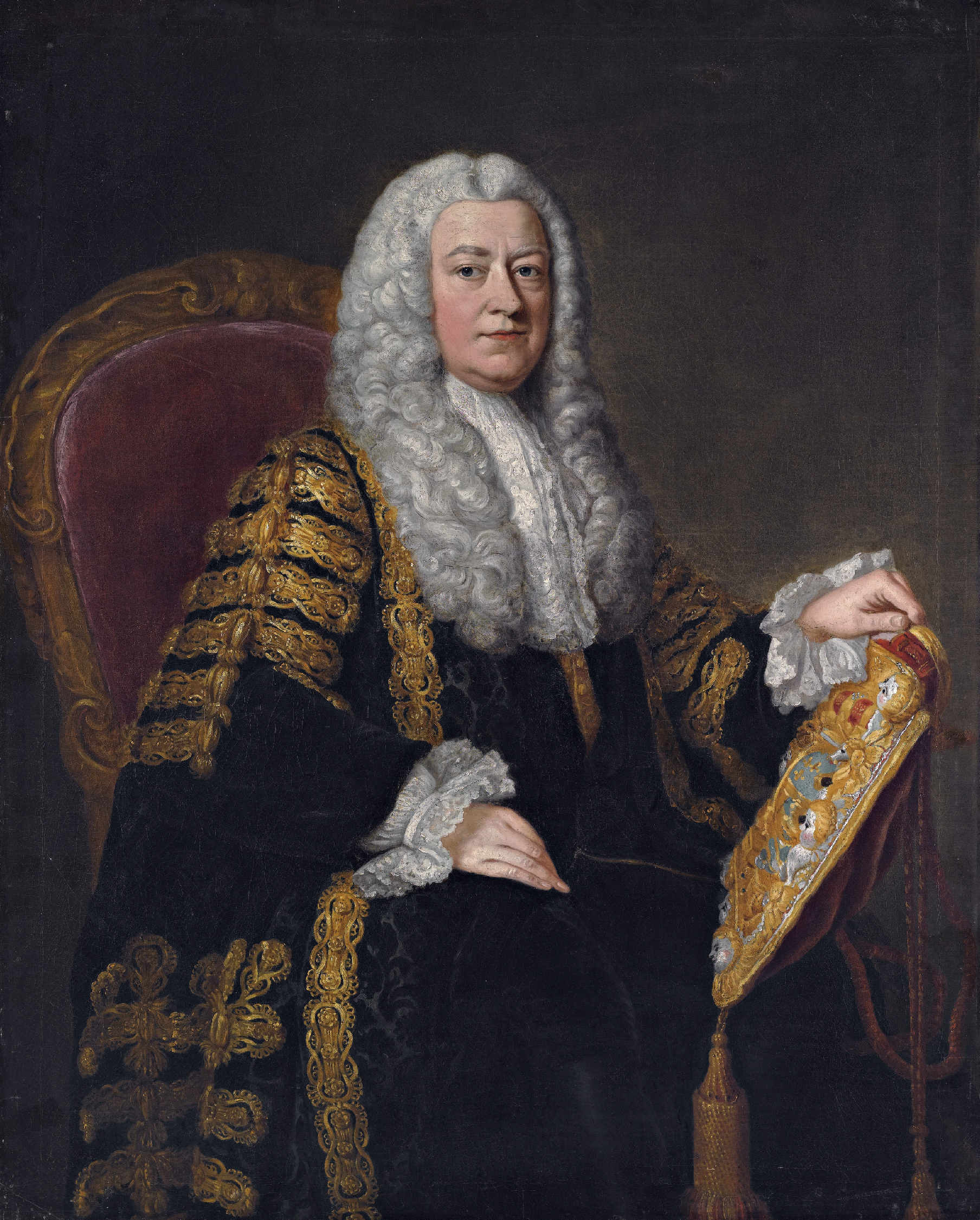
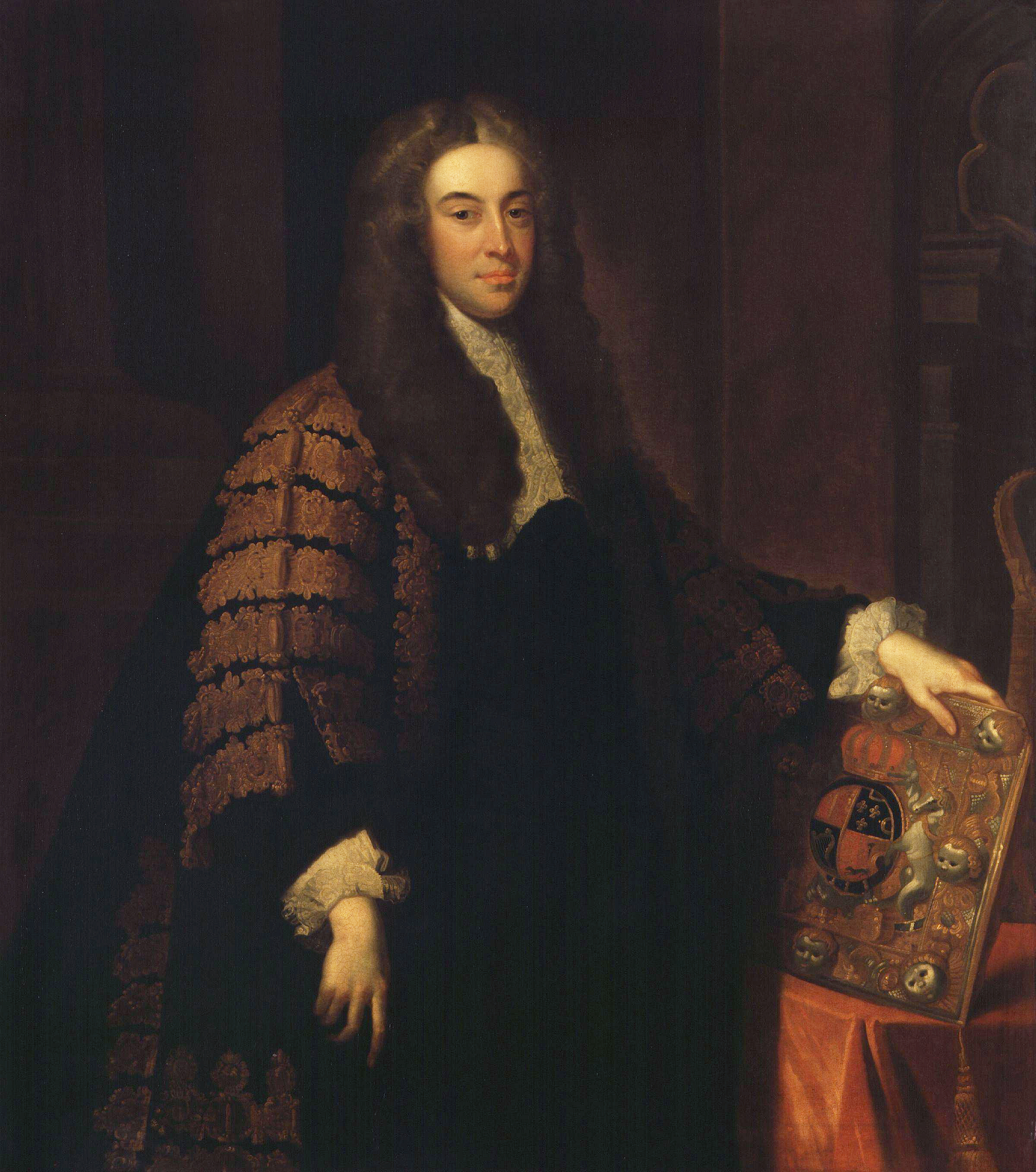
Portraits of Philip Yorke and Charles Talbot

The Yorke–Talbot slavery opinion was a legal opinion issued by two Crown law officers in 1729 relating to the legality of slavery under English law.

== Background ==
The opinion was sought by slave merchants after certain judicial decisions by Lord Chief Justice Holt. Earlier judicial decisions had upheld the legality of slavery in relation to African slaves on the basis that they were infidels. However, in Chamberlain v Harvey (1697) 1 Ld Raym 146 and in Smith v Gould (1705–07) 2 Salk 666 Lord Holt rejected this approach, but suggested on a wider basis that slaves were not chattels capable of supporting a legal property claim. (Note: Lord Holt rejected an assumpsit claim on the sale of a negro in England: "as soon as a negro comes to England he is free; one may be a villein in England, but not a slave" in Smith v Brown. However, it was accepted that this was more a technical argument about the status of a slave rather than a fundamental statement on the rights of man.) The clear concern of the slave traders was that, at best, Christian Africans could not be slaves, and that baptism would manumit a slave (and in fact a number of slaves were baptised and claimed on this basis to be free), and at worst, there might be no legally enforceable property rights in a slave. Views had also been expressed that, whatever the position of slaves in the colonies, a slave in England could not be restrained against his will.

The opinion was written by Sir Philip Yorke (then the Attorney General) and Charles Talbot (then the Solicitor General), each of whom would later rise to the rank of Lord Chancellor as Lord Hardwicke and Lord Talbot respectively. They wrote the opinion in their capacity as law officers of the Crown, and so was only an opinion and not a judgment of a court. Despite this, the opinion was frequently cited by those who argued that Black slaves could be viewed as chattel under common law, despite its lack of support from precedent.

== Opinion ==
Yorke and Talbot opined that under English law:

1. a slave's status did not change when he came to England, (Note: There was a popular perception in the day that a slave which set foot in England was free. As early as 1577 William Harrison in his Description of England asserted that when slaves came to England "all note of servile bondage is utterly removed from them". More importantly, in the first edition of his hugely influential work, Commentaries on the Laws of England, William Blackstone asserted that slaves were free when they came to England, although he changed his view in subsequent editions.)
2. a slave could be compelled to return to the colonies from England, and
3. that baptism would not free a slave.

They summarised the following:

We are of opinion, that a slave coming from the West-Indies to Great-Britain or Ireland, with or without his master, doth not become free, and that his master's property or right in him is not thereby determined or varied; and that baptism doth not bestow freedom on him, or make any alteration in his temporal condition in these kingdoms. We are also of opinion, that his master may legally compel him to return again to the plantations.

The opinion cited no authorities, and set out no legal rationale for the views expressed in it, but it was widely published and relied upon. The opinion was largely accepted in England as a definitive statement of the law for nearly 40 years. Curiously, the opinion made no reference either to the abolition of trade in serfs of 1102 by the Council of Westminster, (Note: The abolition was not by way of statute, statutes being unknown in England at the time, and effect of the provisions in that time of nascent constitutional law was somewhat uncertain.) or to the decision in In the matter of Cartwright, 11 Elizabeth; 2 Rushworth's Coll 468 (1569), a case often cited as authority for the statement "that England has too pure an air for a slave to breathe in." (Note: However, suggestions that the court stated this all generally trace back to the argument of counsel in Somersett's case. However, it is not clear that the pronouncement was in fact made, and many believe that it is actually a misquote of Lord Henley's comment "As soon as a man sets foot on English ground he is free" in the later case Shanley v Harvey (1763) 2 Eden 126 at 127. For one of Somersett's counsel (Francis Hargrave), it was his first ever case, and such an error would not be entirely surprising (although other members of Somersett's pro bono legal team were far more experienced).) Nor did it refer to the two decisions of Lord Holt (Chamberlain v Harvey and Smith v Gould) which led to so much of the controversy.

== Aftermath ==
Yorke subsequently endorsed the views expressed in the opinion (although not expressly referring to it) whilst sitting in his judicial capacity as Lord Chancellor in Pearne v Lisle (1749) Amb 75, 27 ER 47. (Note: The case revolved around title to fourteen slaves who were in Antigua, and involved a number of technical points as to colonial law. But Lord Hardwicke held that slavery was not contrary to English law, and that as the common law of England applied at the time to Antigua, that slavery was not unlawful in Antigua; it was the latter determination that was ultimately to have more effect on the abolition of slavery.) However, in 1772, Lord Mansfield held that no person could be forcibly removed from England as a slave in England in Somersett's case on application for habeas corpus made on behalf of the escaped slave, James Somersett. Yet mindful of Hardwicke's holding in Pearne v Lisle that English law would apply throughout the British Empire, and conscious of the economic ruin which the sudden abolition of slavery would cause in the colonies, Mansfield limited his ruling territorially.

Ultimately slavery would be abolished by statute in both England and throughout the colonies pursuant to the Slavery Abolition Act 1833.

== Original document ==
A contemporary document upon which the opinion was written is preserved in Northumberland Archives. Copies of it can be viewed online.

A transcript of the document is as follows:

Nr Moot Case 100 – In order to rectify a Mistake that Slaves become

ffree by their being in England or Ireland or being Baptised, it hath

been thot proper to consult the Kings Atty & Sollt Gen & whose opin's

were as follows

We are of Opinion that a Slave coming from the West Indies

To GB or Ireland, with or without his Master, doth not become free;

And that his Mars property or Right in him is not thereby determined

or varied; And that Baptism doth not bestow ffreedom upon him,

or make any Alteration in his Temporal Condn in these Kingdoms

We are also of Opin that his Mar may legally compel him to return

agn to yeplantations.

Yorke

Talbot

The following is a translation of the document:

Number Moot Case 100 – In order to rectify a mistake that slaves become

free by their being in England or Ireland or being baptised, it hath [has]

been thought proper to consult the King's Attorney and Solicitor General and whose opinions

were as follows:

We are of opinion that a slave, coming from the West Indies

to Great Britain or Ireland, with or without his master, doth [does] not become free;

And that his master's property or right in him is not thereby determined

or varied; And that baptism doth [does] not bestow freedom upon him,

or make any alternation in his temporal condition in these Kingdoms

We are also of opinion that his master may legally compel him to return

again to the plantations.

Yorke

Talbot

== See also ==
- Slavery at common law
