= Slavery at common law =

Law of slavery in the British Empire

Slavery at common law in the British Empire developed slowly over centuries, and was characterised by inconsistent decisions and varying rationales for the treatment of slavery, the slave trade, and the rights of slaves and slave owners. Unlike in its colonies, within the home islands of Britain, until 1807, except for statutes facilitating and taxing the international slave trade, there was virtually no legislative intervention in relation to slaves as property, and accordingly the common law had something of a "free hand" to develop, untrammelled by the "paralysing hand of the Parliamentary draftsmen". (Note: Parliament was not totally silent on the subject of slavery. Although no legislation was ever passed which either expressly legalised slavery prior to the abolition acts, slavery was mentioned in passing in several acts of parliament, all of which tacitly assumed it to be lawful. A list of the British statutes relating to slavery can be found here, no less than 13 of which pre-date abolition. Further, a number of statutes were also passed in the British colonies, where the common law applied, including the Amelioration Act 1798 passed in the Leeward Islands regulating the ownership of slaves.) Two attempts to pass a slave code via Parliament itself both failed, one in the 1660s and the other in 1674.

Some scholars assert slavery was not recognised as lawful, often on the basis of pronouncements such as those attributed to Lord Mansfield, that "the air of England is too pure for any slave to breathe". (Note: Academics dispute the true origin of the saying. Some believe it dates from In the matter of Cartwright, 11 Elizabeth; 2 Rushworth's Coll 468 (1569), and others believe it is a misquote of Lord Henley's comments in Shanley v Harvey (1763) 2 Eden 126 at 127) However the true legal position has been both complex and contested. In the 17th and 18th centuries, some African slaves were openly held, bought, sold, and searched for when escaping within Britain.

== Early common law ==
There was an Irish decree in 1171 "that all the English slaves in the whole of Ireland, be immediately emancipated and restored to their former liberty". The same source indicates that slavery in England was abolished by a general charter of emancipation in 1381. Other historical sources for such an emancipation proclamation appear thin, although the date would coincide with the Peasants' Revolt, after which a number of concessions were made by the 14-year-old King Richard II, which were later rescinded. Certainly villeinage continued in England, slowly decaying, until the last villein died in the early 17th century.

In later common law cases, none of the foregoing decrees or proclamations were cited or referred to as binding law in relation to the status of slaves generally.

== Cartwright's case ==
In 1569, a man, Cartwright, was observed savagely beating another, which in law would have amounted to a battery, unless a defence could be mounted. Cartwright averred that the man was a slave whom he had brought to England from Russia, and thus such chastisement was not unlawful. The case is reported by John Rushworth in his 1680 summary of John Lilburne's case of 1649. He wrote: "Whipping was painful and shameful, Flagellation for Slaves. In the Eleventh of Elizabeth [i.e., 1569], one Cartwright brought a Slave from Russia, and would scourge him, for which he was questioned; and it was resolved, That England was too pure an Air for Slaves to breathe in. And indeed it was often resolved, even in Star-Chamber, That no Gentleman was to be whipt for any offence whatsoever; and his whipping was too severe." It is reported that the court held that the man must be freed, and it is often said that the court held "that England was too pure an air for a slave to breathe in." (Note: Reports that the court held this all generally trace back to the argument of counsel in Somersett's case; however, the documents of the original case of 1569 have not been found. Others have suggested that it is a misquote of Lord Hardwicke's comment "As soon as a man sets foot on English ground he is free" in Shanley v Harvey (1763) 2 Eden 126 at 127. Wherever the pronouncement originated, various reports alter the grammar and phraseology of the judgment, the original words of which were most likely only ever issued orally, and thus can never be definitively ascertained.)

It is unclear whether the effect of the case was to actually make slavery in England illegal, or rather generally to impose limits on the physical punishment on slaves. In no subsequent common law cases prior to Somersett's case was Cartwright's case cited as authority for the proposition that slavery was unlawful. However, those disputes predominantly concerned disputes between slave merchants (the notable exception being Shanley v Harvey, as to which see below), for whom it would have been commercially unwise to plead that slavery was unlawful.

It has been inferred that, because he was from Russia, Cartwright's slave was white and probably a Christian, although this is not recorded. (Note: In his arguments in Somersett's case, Granville Sharp averred that the court held, "and it was resolved, that England was too pure an air for a slave to breathe, and so everyone who breathes it becomes free. Everyone who comes to this island is entitled to the protection of English law, whatever oppression he may have suffered and whatever may be the colour of his skin." However it is not clear from where Sharp drew this authority, and he may have embellished the reports of the decision that he had found.)

== African slave trade and the common law ==
However, the initial opposition of the courts of England to the status of slavery began to change with the rising importance of the African slave trade. An extensive traffic in black slaves from Africa began in the 17th century, primarily to supply labour for the sugar and tobacco plantations in British colonies abroad. In the Caribbean, Barbados became an English Colony in 1624 and Jamaica in 1655. These and other Caribbean colonies became the centre of wealth and the focus of the slave trade for the growing English empire. In 1660, what became the Royal African Company was chartered by King Charles II with a monopoly in the trade. The Royal African Company, governed by James, Duke of York, the king's brother, was central to England's slave trade, and its commercial disputes over slavery soon presented the English courts with novel legal questions. Under the lex mercatoria slaves were sometimes treated as chattels, with few if any rights, but the English courts did not always recognise mercantile custom as law, and even in English mercantile law, the subject was disputed. The question arose in English courts because personal actions could be laid in England even if the cause of action arose abroad. In 1698, an act of Parliament, the Trade with Africa Act 1697 (9 Will. 3. c. 26), opened the slave trade to all English subjects. In the 18th century, owners in England would advertise their sales of African slaves and also for the return of runaway slaves.

=== Butts v. Penny and defining people as property ===
In 1677, after the Royal African Company went bankrupt, the high court of King's Bench intervened to change the legal rationale for slavery from feudal law to the law of property. In 1677 in Butts v. Penny the courts held that an action for trover (a kind of trespass) would lie for black people, as if they were chattels. The rationale was that infidels could not be subjects because they could not swear an oath of allegiance to make them so (as determined in Calvin's Case in 1608). As aliens, they could be considered as "goods" rather than people for purposes of trade. Chief Justice Holt rejected such a status for people in Harvey v. Chamberlain in 1696, and also denied the possibility of bringing an assumpsit (another kind of trespass) on the sale of a black person in England: "as soon as a negro comes to England he is free; one may be a villein in England, but not a slave." It is alleged that he commented as an aside in one case that the supposed owner could amend his declaration to state that a deed was created for the sale in the royal colony of Virginia, where slavery was recognised by colonial law, but such a claim goes against the main finding in the case. In 1706 Chief Justice Holt refused an action of trover in relation to a slave, holding that no man could have property in another, but held that an alternative action, trespass quare captivum suum cepit, might be available.

Ultimately the Holt court decisions had little long-term effect. Slaves were regularly bought and sold on the Liverpool and London markets, and actions on contract concerning slaves were common in the 18th century without any serious suggestion that they were void for illegality, although the York-Talbot position, discussed below, probably helped to create that legal stability. In 1700 there was no extensive use of slave labour in England as in the colonies. African servants were common as status symbols, but their treatment was not comparable to that of plantation slaves in the colonies. The legal problems that were most likely to arise in England were if a slave were to escape in transit, or if a slave-owner from the colonies brought over a slave and expected to continue exercising his power to prevent the slave from leaving his service. Increasing numbers of slaves were brought into England in the 18th century, and this may help to explain the growing awareness of the problems presented by the existence of slavery. Quite apart from the moral considerations, there was an obvious conflict between defining property in slaves and an alternative English tradition of freedom protected by habeas corpus. If the courts acknowledged the property which was generally assumed to exist in slaves in the colonies, how would such property rights be treated if a slave was subsequently brought to England?

=== The Yorke–Talbot slavery opinion ===
However, the decisions of the Holt court in the wake of the Glorious Revolution had caused sufficient consternation as to the legal status of slaves that some slave owners sought clarity of the law. In 1729 various slave owners obtained the Yorke–Talbot slavery opinion made by the Crown's principal law officers at one of the Inns of Court. (Note: The opinion was written by Philip Yorke and Charles Talbot, each of whom would later rise to the rank of Lord Chancellor) The law officers opined that under English law (i) a slave's status did not change when he came to England, (Note: There was a popular perception in the day that a slave which set foot in England was free. As early as 1577 William Harrison in his Description of England asserted that when slaves came to England "all note of servile bondage is utterly removed from them". More importantly, in the first edition of his hugely influential work, Commentaries on the Laws of England, William Blackstone asserted that slaves were free when they came to England, although he changed his view in subsequent editions.) (ii) a slave could be compelled to return to the colonies from England, and (iii) that baptism would not manumit a slave. The opinion cited no authorities, and set out no legal rationale for the views expressed in it, but it was widely published and relied upon. One of the authors of the opinion, Lord Hardwicke (although at the time he was only known as Philip Yorke), subsequently endorsed the views expressed in the opinion (although not expressly referring to it) whilst sitting in judicial capacity in Pearne v Lisle (1749) Amb 75, 27 ER 47. The case revolved around title to fourteen slaves who were in Antigua, and involved a number of technical points as to colonial law. But Lord Hardwicke held that slavery was not contrary to English law, and that as the common law of England applied at the time to Antigua, that slavery was not unlawful in Antigua. (Note: It was this determination that the common law of England applied in the colonies that was part of the angst which Lord Mansfield underwent in relation to the Somersett decision; he knew that if he held slavery to be unlawful in England, it would de facto mean it was unlawful throughout the colonies and would cause economic ruin. This may be why he sought to limit his ruling territorially.)

At this time the cases in which the English courts had recognised property in slaves had arisen from purely commercial disputes and did not establish any rights exercisable as against the slaves themselves, if the slave was within the jurisdiction. As with villeins centuries before, the analogy with chattels (as between putative owners) failed to answer the leading question whether slaves could establish their freedom by bringing suit in the courts (as between slave and owner). The writ de homine replegiando was outmoded, and so the usual eighteenth-century question was whether habeas corpus lay to free slaves from captivity. Sir William Blackstone was in no doubt that "the spirit of liberty is so deeply ingrained in our constitution" that a slave, the moment he lands in England, is free. (Note: Although he resiled from this position later, some argue under political pressure.) Other prominent lawyers, such as Lord Hardwicke and Lord Mansfield, felt that it was better to recognise slavery, and to impose regulation on the slave trade rather than to withdraw from it, since less enlightened nations would reap the benefits of abolition and slaves would suffer the consequences. The "infidel" argument for maintaining African slaves as chattels was abandoned in the middle of the 18th century, since by then many slaves had been converted to Christianity without gaining de facto freedom; and legal justifications for slave ownership were now sought by analogy with the old law of villeinage.

== Shanley v Harvey ==
In Shanley v Harvey (1763) 2 Eden 126, a claim was instituted by Shanley as administrator of the estate of his deceased niece.

Shanley had brought Harvey as a child slave, to England, 12 years earlier and had given him to his niece. She had him baptised and had changed his name. She became very ill and about an hour before her death, she gave Harvey about £800 in cash (a substantial sum in those days), asked him to pay the butcher's bill (Note: The case report is not clear whether this was literally a butcher's bill, or whether this was the popular eighteenth century slang for the physician's fees.) and to make good use of the money. After her death, Shanley brought an action against Harvey to recover the money.

Lord Henley, the Lord Chancellor, dismissed the action, with costs against Shanley. In his judgment he held that as soon as a person set foot on English soil, he or she became free and that a "negro" might maintain an action against his or her master for ill usage, together with an application for habeas corpus if detained. However, such comments were not necessary for the decision in the case, and in law were only obiter dictum and not binding on subsequent courts.

== R v Stapylton ==
One of the few non-commercial disputes relating to slavery arose in R v Stapylton (1771, unreported) in which Lord Mansfield sat. Stapylton was charged after attempting to forcibly deport his purported slave, Thomas Lewis. Stapylton's defence rested on the basis that as Lewis was his slave, his actions were lawful.

Lord Mansfield had the opportunity to use a legal procedure at the time in criminal cases referred to as the Twelve Judges to determine points of law (which were not for the jury) in criminal matters. However, he shied away from doing so, and sought (unsuccessfully) to dissuade the parties from using the legality of slavery as the basis of the defence.

In the end Mansfield directed the jury that they should presume Lewis was a free man, unless Stapylton was able to prove otherwise. He further directed the jury that unless they found that Stapylton was the legal owner of Lewis "you will find the Defendant guilty". Lewis was permitted to testify. The jury convicted. However, in the course of his summing up, Lord Mansfield was careful to say "whether they [slave owners] have this kind of property or not in England has never been solemnly determined."

== James Somersett's case ==
The question of a slave's rights as against his putative master (as opposed to merchants' rights as against each other) eventually came before Lord Mansfield and the King's Bench in 1771. A writ of habeas corpus had been issued to secure the release of James Somersett, a black man confined in irons on board a ship arrived in the Thames from Virginia, bound for Jamaica, and the return stated that he was a slave under the law of Virginia. Lord Mansfield was anxious to avoid the underlying issue of whether slavery was lawful, and pressed the parties to settle; but the case was taken up by the West India merchants, who wanted to know whether slaves were a safe investment, and by abolitionists such as Granville Sharp, so that it became a cause célèbre.

Delivering his judgement, Lord Mansfield stated that slavery was so 'odious' that it could only be introduced by positive (i.e. statute) law, of which there was none in English law. However, as he later confirmed, he ruled narrowly only that a master could not forcibly deport him (see R v Inhabitants of Thames Ditton below). He ordered that "the black must be discharged", granting Stewart freedom.

The judgement had far-reaching implications. In his book on King George III, Andrew Roberts argues that it added another reason for American colonists to oppose British rule, particularly those in the south, who might otherwise have been expected to have been less supportive of American independence. Answering this as well as Somersett's counsel who had put pressure on the court by observing the very large profits dependent on slavery, Mansfield said, "fiat justitia, ruat cælum, let justice be done whatever be the consequence."

== R v Inhabitants of Thames Ditton ==
Lord Mansfield subsequently commented upon his decision in the Somersett case in R v Inhabitants of Thames Ditton (1785) The official report notes that Mansfield expressed the view during counsel's argument that his ruling in the Somerset case decided only that a slave could not be forcibly removed from England against his will: "The determinations go no further than that the master cannot by force compel him to go out of the kingdom." In Thames Ditton a black woman by the name of Charlotte Howe had been brought to England as a slave by one Captain Howe. After Captain Howe died Charlotte sought poor relief from the Parish of Thames Ditton. Mansfield stated that the Somersett case had only determined that a master could not force a slave to leave England, much as in earlier times a master could not forcibly remove his villein. He ruled that Charlotte was not entitled to relief under Poor Laws because relief was dependent on having been "hired", and this did not relate to slaves.

== Joseph Knight's case ==
In 1777 after the Mansfield decision in England, a servant in Scotland, Joseph Knight, sought the freedom to leave the employment of John Wedderburn of Ballendean, and claimed in his pleadings that the very act of landing in Scotland freed him from perpetual servitude, as slavery was not recognised in Scotland (records do not now record whether this was on the basis of the Mansfield decision). Many years earlier Knight had been purchased by Wedderburn in Jamaica from a slave trader, although his status at the time of the trial was the subject of disagreement (Knight averred that Wedderburn wished to take him back to Jamaica to sell him on as a slave in the colonies, which Wedderburn denied).

The case caused disagreement in the courts as Wedderburn insisted that slavery and perpetual servitude were different states. He argued that in Scots law Knight, even though he was not recognised as a slave, was still bound to provide perpetual service in the same manner as an indentured servant or an apprenticed artisan. The Justices of the Peace in Perth, at first instance, found in favour of Wedderburn. However, when Knight then appealed to the Sheriff Deputy the first instance decision was then overturned. Wedderburn then made a further appeal to the Lords of Council and Session. The Court of Session emphatically rejected Wedderburn's appeal, ruling that

"the dominion assumed over this Negro, under the law of Jamaica, being unjust, could not be supported in this country to any extent: That, therefore, the defender had no right to the Negro’s service for any space of time, nor to send him out of the country against his consent: That the Negro was likewise protected under the act 1701, c.6. from being sent out of the country against his consent."

Evidence presented by both sides in the case survives in the National Archives of Scotland (reference CS235/K/2/2). Henry Dundas, then Lord Advocate, acted for Knight.

== Zong massacre ==
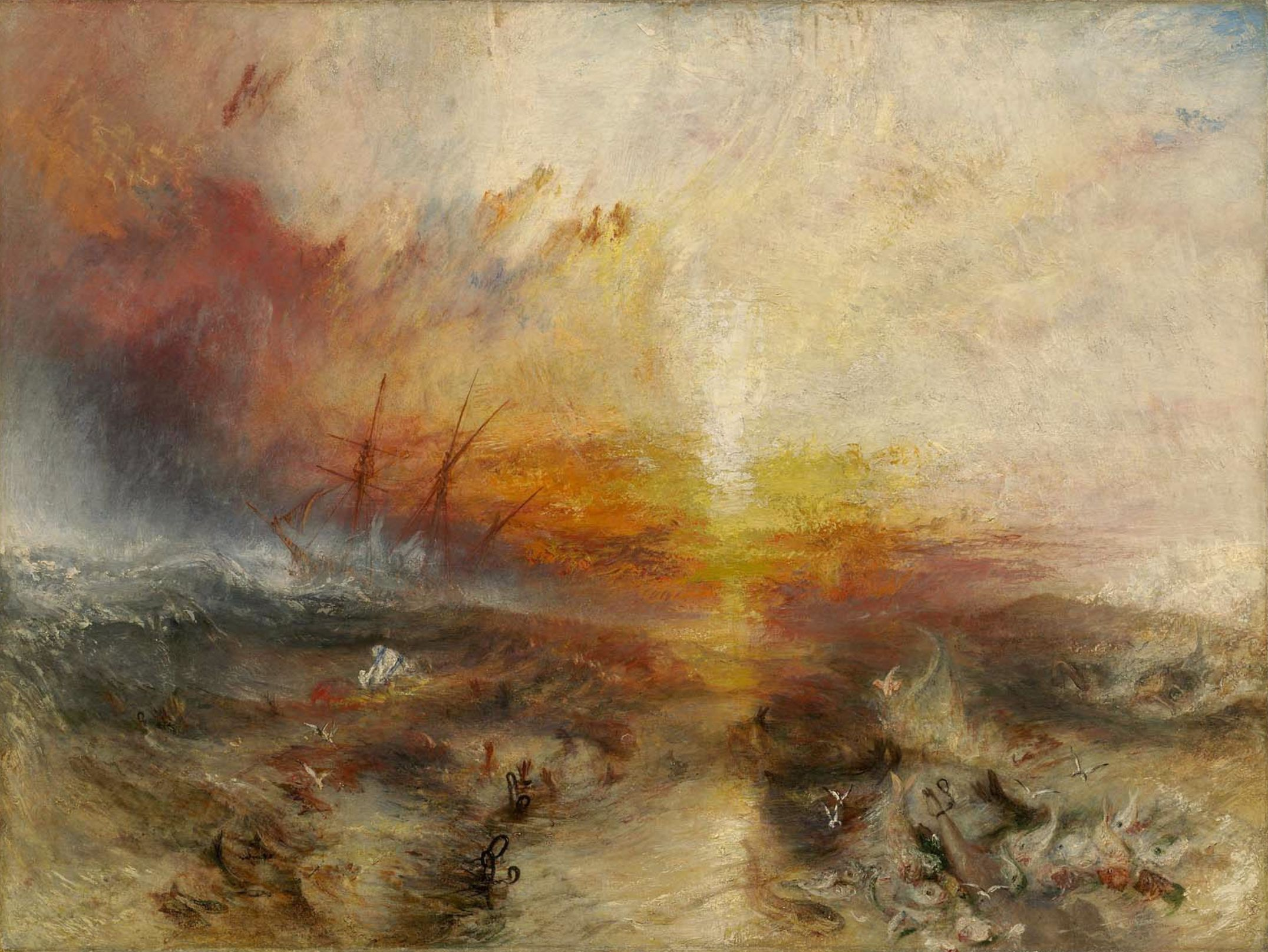
The Slave Ship, J. M. W. Turner's representation of the mass murder of slaves, inspired by the Zong killings

In late November or early December 1781 the captain and crew of the English slave ship, Zong, threw various African slaves into the sea off the island of Hispaniola, to save the lives of the remaining slaves as provisions were short. The shipowners then sought to claim under policies of insurance, arguing that jettisoning the cargo constituted a recoverable loss, even though it necessarily resulted in the murder of the slaves. In the first round of legal proceedings a jury initially held for the shipowners and upheld the claim. On a subsequent application to set that judgment aside, Lord Mansfield indicated that the jury in the initial trial "had no doubt (though it shocks one very much) that the Case of Slaves was the same as if Horses had been thrown over board". That finding was overturned and fresh trial ordered, but in both legal actions it was accepted in principle by the court that the killing of the negro slaves was permissible, and did not thereby invalidate the insurance by virtue of being an unlawful act. Shortly afterwards provisions in the Slave Trade Act 1788 made it unlawful to insure against similar losses of slaves.

== R v Hodge ==
In 1811, Arthur Hodge became the first (and only) British subject ever to stand trial for the murder of a slave. As part of his defence, Hodge argued that "A Negro being property, it was no greater offense for his master to kill him than it would be to kill his dog," but the court did not accept the submission, and point was dismissed summarily. (Note: Counsel for the prosecution averred that killing a slave had always been contrary to the common law, but cited no authority for this proposition.) Counsel for the prosecution also obliquely referred to the Amelioration Act 1798 passed by the Legislature of the Leeward Islands, which applied in the British Virgin Islands. That Act provided for penalties for slave owners who inflicted cruel or unusual punishments on their slaves, but it only provides for fines, and does not expressly indicate that a slave owner could be guilty of a greater crime such as murder or another offence against the person.

The trial took place under English common law in British Virgin Islands. However, there was no appeal (Hodge was executed a mere eight days after the jury handed down their verdict). The jury (composed largely of slave owners) actually recommended mercy, but the court nonetheless sentenced Hodge to death, and so the directions of the trial judge are not treated by commentators as an authoritative precedent.

== Forbes v Cochrane ==
Confirmation of the Mansfield ruling, that "positive law" would be required to make slavery lawful, appears in the judgment of Mr. Justice Best in Forbes v Cochrane in 1824. He said, "There is no statute recognising slavery which operates in that part of the British empire in which we are now called upon to administer justice." He described the Somerset case as entitling a slave in England to discharge (from that status), and rendering any person attempting to force him back into slavery as guilty of trespass. But not all reports of the case agree.

== Subsequent legislation ==
The common law, ultimately, would go no further. But the decision of 1772 in James Somersett's case was widely interpreted as making slavery illegal. Whilst some academics have disupted this, the perception was fuelled by the growing abolitionist movement, notwithstanding this was scarcely an accurate reflection of the decision. Slavery did not, like villeinage, die naturally from adverse public opinion, because vested mercantile interests were too valuable. The Slave Trade Act 1788 (28 Geo. 3. c. 54) was passed, partly in response to the Zong Massacre to ameliorate the conditions under which slaves might be transported (the act would be renewed several times before being made permanent in 1799). In 1792 the House of Commons voted in favour of "gradual" abolition, and Parliament outlawed the African slave trade by enacting the Slave Trade Act 1807 (47 Geo. 3 Sess. 1. c. 36). The offences created by the act were made felony in 1811, to discourage contraband traffic. Slaves exported contrary to the act were forfeited to the king, for the purpose only of divesting property. This prevented British merchants exporting any more people from Africa, but it did not alter the status of the several million existing slaves, and the courts continued to recognise colonial slavery. The abolitionists therefore turned their attention to the emancipation of West Indian slaves. Legally, this was difficult to achieve, since it required the compulsory divesting of private property; but it was finally done by the Slavery Abolition Act 1833 (3 & 4 Will. 4. c. 73) at a cost of £20 million paid from public funds to compulsorily purchase slaves from their owners and then manumit them. Freed slaves themselves received no compensation for their forced labour. (Note: Slaves were usually fed, clothed, and housed at their 'owner's' expense, thus while enslaved had been, in financial terms, better off than many apprentices.) From 1 August 1834, all slaves in the British colonies were "absolutely and forever manumitted." (Note: Transitional provisions, turning the freed slaves into bound "apprentices", ended in 1838.)

In British colonies, it was widely assumed that positive law was needed to make slavery lawful, and various royal colonies passed laws to this effect. (Note: In 1641 Massachusetts was the first colony to legalise slavery; this was followed by Connecticut (1650), Virginia (1661), Maryland (1663) and New York and New Jersey (1664). See generally History of slavery § Slavery in North America)

== See also ==
- Abolitionism in the United Kingdom
- Colliers and Salters (Scotland) Act 1775
- History of slavery
- Joseph Knight (slave)
- Slavery Abolition Act 1833
- Slavery in international law
- Slavery in the colonial United States
- Slave Trade Acts, with a listing of international, UK and US slavery laws
- Slave Trade Act 1807
- Slavery in Britain
- Slavery in Ireland
- Somersett's case
