= Charles Stewart (customs official) =

Scottish customs official, merchant, and slaveowner

Charles Stewart was an 18th-century Scottish customs official and merchant who was the slaveowner in the Somerset v Stewart case.

== Early career ==
Stewart was born in Scotland but emigrated to British America. He became a successful merchant in the port town of Norfolk, Virginia. He came to official notice during the Seven Years' War, when in 1762 a ship carrying Spanish prisoners of war ran aground near Norfolk. An angry mob set upon the Spaniards, killing two before Stewart intervened to save the lives of the rest. This impressed the authorities, who rewarded him with a post in the customs service. He had risen to be Paymaster General of the American Customs Board by the time he sailed for Britain in 1769.

== Somerset Case ==
In 1749 Stewart had purchased James Somerset, a young Black boy recently enslaved in West Africa and brought across the Atlantic Ocean. Somerset learned English very quickly. Stewart dressed Somerset in more expensive clothes than his other slaves and took him to important business meetings. Stewart took Somerset with him when he went to Britain to help support his sister Cecilia, whose husband had recently died, and her family.

Once in Britain, while working on business for Stewart, Somerset came into contact with a number of free blacks and white abolitionists. Motivated by a desire to secure his freedom, Somerset ran away from Stewart's home in October 1771. Stewart was angered and put up notices about his loss. After Somerset was recaptured in November 1771 he was gaoled aboard the Ann and Mary, which was about to sail for the West Indies where he was to be sold on. Before the ship departed, his abolitionist godparents challenged his detention on the grounds of habeas corpus. The Chief Justice Lord Mansfield temporarily released Somerset while the two sides prepared their cases. Somerset's cause was taken up by Granville Sharp, a leading abolitionist.

Mansfield tried to persuade Stewart to free Somerset, as had happened in several similar recent incidents, thereby avoiding a potentially controversial legal case that might challenge the entire legality of slavery. Stewart refused, and his case was financed by planters in the West Indies who wanted to force a ruling that they believed would confirm that slavery was legal. Although Mansfield indicated to them that he was likely to rule against them, they refused to back down. As a last resort Mansfield tried to persuade Somerset's godmother to buy him from Stewart and set him free, but she declined on principle.

In his final ruling, Mansfield ordered that Somerset be discharged and concluded with an attack on the institution of slavery. Although he subsequently insisted his ruling had not entirely outlawed slavery in England, it was widely taken as such.

== Death ==
Stewart is buried in Greyfriars’ Kirkyard in Edinburgh.

== See also ==
- United States labor law

== Bibliography ==
- Hochschild, Adam. Bury the Chains: The British Struggle to Abolish Slavery. Macmillan, 2005.
- Blumrosen, Alfred W. & Blumrosen, Ruth G. Slave Nation: How Slavery United the Colonies and Sparked the American Revolution. Sourcebooks, 2005.
