= Somerset v Stewart =

1772 case relating to slavery in England

- Court: King's Bench
- Decided: 22 June 1772
- Citations: (1772) 98 ER 499, (1772) 20 State Tr 1, (1772) Lofft 1

Case opinions
- Lord Mansfield

Keywords
- Slavery, abolition

Somerset v Stewart (1772) 98 ER 499 (also known as Sommersett v Steuart, Somersett's case, and the Mansfield Judgment) is a judgment of the English Court of King's Bench, relating to the right of a slave on English soil not to be forcibly removed from the country and sent to Jamaica for sale.

The action was commenced on behalf James Somerset, an enslaved African who had been purchased by Charles Stewart while he was in North America, at the time a British crown colony. On his return to England, Stewart brought Somerset with him. After continuing for some time in servitude in England, Somerset escaped. He was recaptured a few weeks later, and was imprisoned on a ship bound for the British colony of Jamaica, where he was to be sold on to a plantation owner. Friends of Somerset made an application in 1771 to the Court of King's Bench for a writ of habeas corpus, requiring the ship's captain to produce Somerset, and asking the court to determine whether his imprisonment was lawful.

Typically for the period, the actual text of the judgment was not published, other than being read out during the hearing, and has not survived; it is only known through third-party reports. According to one reported version of the case, Lord Mansfield decided that:

The state of slavery is of such a nature that it is incapable of being introduced on any reasons, moral or political, but only by positive law, which preserves its force long after the reasons, occasions, and time itself from whence it was created, is erased from memory. It is so odious, that nothing can be suffered to support it, but positive law. Whatever inconveniences, therefore, may follow from the decision, I cannot say this case is allowed or approved by the law of England; and therefore the black must be discharged.

Lord Mansfield found that to the extent that the laws of England and Wales had ever permitted slavery, those laws were superseded by later law or were otherwise defunct. This absence of a current English statute ("positive law") under which the court might remand someone as a slave proved decisive, as Mansfield refused to accept any other basis for the court to order something that he considered repugnant. The case was closely followed throughout the Empire, particularly in the thirteen American colonies, although the ruling had no direct or immediate effect outside Britain. Scholars have disagreed over precisely what legal precedent the Somerset case set.

== Facts ==
James Somerset, an enslaved African, was purchased by Charles Stewart (or Steuart), a customs officer when he was in Boston, Province of Massachusetts Bay, a British crown colony in North America.

Stewart brought Somerset with him when he returned to England in 1769, but in October 1771 Somerset escaped. After he was recaptured in November, Stewart had him imprisoned on the ship Ann and Mary (under Captain John Knowles), bound for the British colony of Jamaica. He directed that Somerset be sold to a plantation for labour. Somerset's three godparents from his baptism as a Christian in England—John Marlow, Thomas Walkin and Elizabeth Cade—made an application on 3 December before the Court of King's Bench for a writ of habeas corpus. Captain Knowles on 9 December produced Somerset before the Court of King's Bench, which had to determine whether his imprisonment was lawful.

The Chief Justice of the King's Bench, Lord Mansfield, ordered a hearing for 21 January; in the meantime he set the prisoner free on recognisance. Somerset's counsel's request to prepare arguments was granted, and so it was not until 7 February 1772 that the case was heard. In the meantime, the case had attracted a great deal of attention in the press and members of the public donated money to support the lawyers for both sides of the argument.

Granville Sharp, an abolitionist layman who continually sought test cases against the legal justifications for slavery, was Somerset's real backer. When the case was heard, five advocates appeared for Somerset, speaking at three hearings between February and May. These lawyers included Francis Hargrave, a young lawyer who made his reputation with this, his first case; James Mansfield; Serjeant-at-law William Davy; Serjeant-at-law John Glynn; John Alleyne; and the noted Irish lawyer and orator John Philpot Curran, whose lines in defence of Somerset were often quoted by American abolitionists, such as Frederick Douglass and Harriet Beecher Stowe in Uncle Tom's Cabin, chapter 37.

Somerset's advocates argued that while colonial laws might permit slavery, neither the common law of England nor any statutory law made by Parliament recognised the existence of slavery, and that slavery in England was therefore unlawful. They also argued that English contract law did not allow for any person to enslave himself, nor could any contract be binding without the person's consent. The arguments focused on legal details rather than any humanitarian principles. When the two lawyers for Charles Stewart put their case, they argued that property was paramount and that it would be dangerous to free all the black people in England (who, according to Lord Mansfield's later judgment in the case, numbered 14,000 or 15,000).

== Legal basis, and judgment ==
The case was commenced by a writ of habeas corpus, a writ that had been described by William Blackstone as "great and efficacious ... in all manner of illegal confinement". Such a writ requires the defendant to produce their prisoner before the court, and to show cause why the imprisonment is lawful.

After hearing oral arguments, Lord Mansfield proposed that Stewart could avoid the potentially far-reaching effects on slave-owners' profits if he were to allow Somerset to go free and not to insist on the court issuing a final judgment. Otherwise, Mansfield said that he would give judgment, and "let justice be done whatever the consequence":

Easter Term, May 14, 1772.

... Mr. Stewart advances no claim on contract; he rests his whole demand on a right to the negro as slave, and mentions the purpose of detainure to be the sending of him over to be sold in Jamaica. If the parties will have judgment, fiat justitia, ruat cælum, let justice be done whatever be the consequence. £50 a head may not be a high price; then a loss follows to the proprietors of above £700,000 sterling. How would the law stand with respect to their settlement; their wages? How many actions for any slight coercion by the master? We cannot in any of these points direct the law; the law must rule us. In these particulars, it may be matter of weighty consideration, what provisions are made or set by law. Mr. Stewart may end the question, by discharging or giving freedom to the negro.

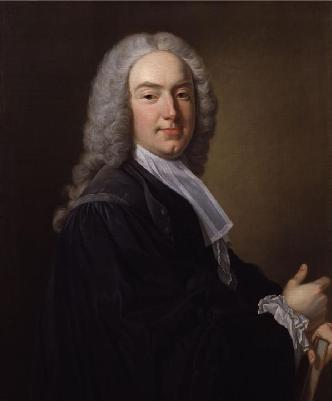
Portrait of William Murray by Jean-Baptiste van Loo, 1737. As Lord Mansfield he sat in judgement on the case

Stewart opted to continue with the case, and Mansfield retired to make his decision, reserving judgment for more than a month. He gave his judgment on 22 June 1772 (this version, with modern paragraphing, is transcribed from a letter to the General Evening Post, reporting on the trial).

Trinity Term, June 22, 1772.

We pay due attention to the opinion of Sir Philip York and Mr. Talbot in the year 1729, by which they pledged themselves to the British planters for the legal consequences of bringing slaves into this kingdom, or their being baptized; which opinion was repeated and recognized by Lord Hardwicke, sitting as Chancellor on the 19th of October, 1749, to the following effect: he said, that trover would lay for a negro slave; that a notion prevailed, that if a slave came into England, or became a Christian, he thereby became emancipated; but there was no foundation in law for such a notion; that when he and Lord Talbot were Attorney and Solicitor General, this notion of a slave becoming free by being baptized prevailed so strongly, that the planters industriously prevented their becoming Christians; upon which their opinion was taken, and upon their best consideration they were both clearly of opinion, that a slave did not in the least alter his situation or state toward his master or owner, either by being christened, or coming to England; that though the statute of Charles II had abolished tenure so far, that no man could be a villein regerdane [sic; scribal error: read regardant], yet if he would acknowledge himself a villein engrossed in any Court of Record, he knew of no way by which he could be entitled to his freedom without the consent of his master.

We feel the force of the inconveniences and consequences that will follow the decision of this question. Yet all of us are so clearly of one opinion upon the only question before us, that we think we ought to give judgment, without adjourning the matter to be argued before all the Judges, as usual in the Habeas Corpus, and as we at first intimated an intention of doing in this case. The only question then is, Is the cause returned sufficient for the remanding him? If not, he must be discharged.

The cause returned is, the slave absented himself, and departed from his master's service, and refused to return and serve him during his stay in England; whereupon, by his master's orders, he was put on board the ship by force, and there detained in secure custody, to be carried out of the kingdom and sold. So high an act of dominion must derive its authority, if any such it has, from the law of the kingdom where executed. A foreigner cannot be imprisoned here on the authority of any law existing in his own country: the power of a master over his servant is different in all countries, more or less limited or extensive; the exercise of it therefore must always be regulated by the laws of the place where exercised.

The state of slavery is of such a nature, that it is incapable of now being introduced by Courts of Justice upon mere reasoning or inferences from any principles, natural or political; it must take its rise from positive law; the origin of it can in no country or age be traced back to any other source: immemorial usage preserves the memory of positive law long after all traces of the occasion; reason, authority, and time of its introduction are lost; and in a case so odious as the condition of slaves must be taken strictly, the power claimed by this return was never in use here; no master ever was allowed here to take a slave by force to be sold abroad because he had deserted from his service, or for any other reason whatever; we cannot say the cause set forth by this return is allowed or approved of by the laws of this kingdom, therefore the black must be discharged.

== Significance ==
=== After the decision ===
Somerset was freed and his supporters, who included black and white Londoners, celebrated. While argument by counsel may have been based primarily on legal technicalities, Lord Mansfield appeared to believe that a great moral question had been posed and he deliberately avoided answering that question in full, because of its profound political and economic consequences. In a later case (R v Inhabitants of Thames Ditton (1785)), he commented about the Somerset case: "The determinations go no further than that the master cannot by force compel him to go out of the kingdom."

There were reactions from prominent individuals in Britain over the decision; Sharp rhetorically asked "why is it that the poor sooty African meets with so different a measure of justice in England and America, as to be adjudged free in the one, and in the other held in the most abject Slavery?" The hymnwriter William Cowper wrote in a poem that "we have no slaves at home - then why abroad?" Benjamin Franklin, who was visiting England at the time, was less impressed with the celebrations of British abolitionists over the case, criticising their celebrations,

O Pharisaical Britain! to pride thyself in setting free a single Slave that happens to land on thy coasts, while thy Merchants in all thy ports are encouraged by thy laws to continue a commerce whereby so many hundreds of thousands are dragged into a slavery that can scarce be said to end with their lives, since it is entailed on their posterity!

Mansfield is often misquoted as declaring that "this air is too pure for a slave to breathe in" but no such words appear in the judgment. Rather, these words are part of the peroration of William Davy, Serjeant-at-Law for Somerset, who previously had cited a report of a 1569 case, in the reign of Elizabeth I, in which "one Cartwright brought a slave from Russia and would scourge him; for which he was questioned; and it was resolved, that England was too pure an air for a slave to breathe in"; it is not clear that this was said in the Cartwright case either. Some legal historians think it was a misquote of an excerpt from Lord Chief Justice John Holt's judgment in Smith v Gould, in which he is reported to have said: "as soon as a negro comes to England he is free; one may be a villein in England but not a slave".

=== Precedent ===
Legal academics have argued for years over what legal precedent was set in the case. Differences in reports of the judgment make it hard to determine how far Lord Mansfield went in acknowledging the principles behind his deliberately narrow ruling. The passage of the judgment in the standard collections of law reports does not appear to refer to the removal of slaves by force from the country, whereas the same passage in the informal report by letter to the Evening Post, quoted above, does.

In 1785, Lord Mansfield expressed the view in R v Inhabitants of Thames Ditton that his ruling in the Somerset case decided only that a slave could not be forcibly removed from England against his will. In the Thames Ditton case, a black woman named Charlotte Howe had been brought to England as a slave by one Captain Howe. After Captain Howe died, Charlotte sought poor relief from the Parish of Thames Ditton. Mansfield stated that the Somersett case had determined only that a master could not force a slave to leave England, much as in earlier times a master could not forcibly remove his villein. He ruled that Charlotte was not entitled to relief under Poor Laws because relief was dependent on having been "hired" and this did not relate to slaves. In the official report of the case, Lord Mansfield is recorded as interrupting counsel to state "The determinations go no further than that the master cannot by force compel him to go out of the kingdom."

The official report of Thames Ditton case supports the account of his judgment given in The Times letter and it is the strongest argument for a limited scope to the decision. Mansfield's judgment in the Somerset case does not say explicitly that slaves became free when they entered England—it is silent as to what their status in England was. In the Thames Ditton case, Lord Mansfield appeared to compare a slave's status to that of "villein in gross"—an ancient feudal status of servitude that had not been abolished from English law but which had died out. He had not done so in the Somerset case despite the invitation of Stewart's counsel.

The Somerset judgment, even if limited to prohibiting the forcible removal of slaves from England, established a radical precedent. It went against the published opinion of the Attorney-General, Sir Philip Yorke and the Solicitor-General, Mr Talbot in 1729 and the court decision of Sir Philip Yorke, by then Lord Chancellor Hardwicke, in 1749 in the case of Pearne v Lisle. The latter had stated that slaves were items of property (Hardwicke described them as 'like stock on a farm'), who were not emancipated either by becoming Christian or by entry into England, that possession of them could be recovered by the legal action of trover and that their master might lawfully compel them to leave England with him. The claim of 1749 relied on the opinion of 1729, which quoted no precedents and gave no reasoning. There were other freedom suits with different rulings before 1772, notably Shanley v Harvey (1763) and R v Stapylton (1771, also before Lord Mansfield). While Mansfield's judgment avoided making a definitive judgment about the legality of slavery in England, it nonetheless challenged the assumptions that enslaved people were no more than property and that "Britishness" and whiteness were inseparable categories.

The precedent established by Somerset's case was seen to have wider implications. In The Slave Grace in 1827, Lord Stowell upheld the decision of the Vice-Admiralty Court in Antigua, whereby a slave who had returned to the colonies, after having resided in England for a year where she was free and no authority could be exercised over her, by her voluntary return had to submit to the authority over her resulting from the slavery law of Antigua. Lord Stowell criticised Lord Mansfield's judgment in the Somerset case, describing it as having reversed the judgment of Lord Hardwicke and establishing that "the owners of slaves had no authority or control over them in England, nor any power of sending them back to the colonies".

Lord Stowell further said:

Thus fell a system which had existed in this country without doubt, and which had been occasionally forced upon its colonies and has continued to this day—that is, above fifty years—without further interruption.

This wider reading of Somerset's case appears to be supported by the judgment of Mr. Justice Best in Forbes v Cochrane in 1824. He said, "There is no statute recognising slavery which operates in that part of the British empire in which we are now called upon to administer justice." He described the Somerset case as entitling a slave in England to discharge (from that status) and rendering any person attempting to force him back into slavery as guilty of trespass but not all reports of the case agree.

Whatever the technical legal ratio decidendi of the case, the public at large widely understood the Somerset case to mean that, on English soil at least, no man was a slave.

=== Domestic effect ===
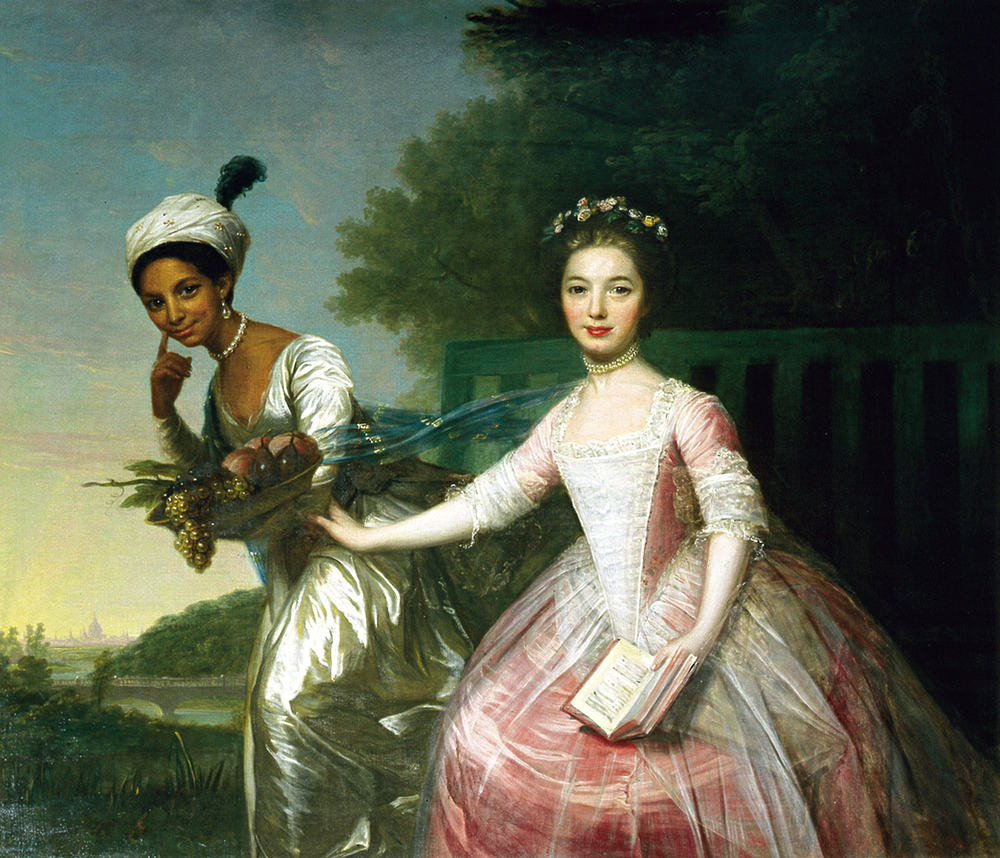
Dido Elizabeth Belle with her cousin Elizabeth Murray, the great-nieces of Lord Mansfield, both were brought up in Kenwood House. Dido Elizabeth Belle and Lady Elizabeth Murray by David Martin, 1778

While Somerset's case provided a boon to the abolitionist movement, it did not end the holding of slaves within England. It also did not end British participation in the slave trade or slavery in other parts of the British Empire, where colonies had established slave laws. Despite the ruling, escaped slaves continued to be recaptured in England. Just a year after the Somerset ruling, there was a newspaper report of a runaway being recaptured and committing suicide in England. Contemporary newspaper advertisements show that slaves continued to be bought and sold in the British Isles. In 1779, a Liverpool newspaper advertised the sale of a black boy and a clipping of the ad was acquired by Sharp. In 1788, anti-slavery campaigners, including Thomas Clarkson and James Ramsay, bought a slave in England to prove that slavery still existed in the country. In 1792, a Bristol newspaper reported the sale of a female African slave in the port.

It was not until 1807 that Parliament decided to suppress the slave trade, outlawing the practice by British subjects and seeking to suppress the trade by foreigners, through the sea power of the Royal Navy. Although the slave trade was suppressed, slavery continued in various parts of the British Empire until it was abolished by the Slavery Abolition Act 1833. The slave merchants who funded Stewart's defence were not anxious about James Somerset or the relatively limited number of slaves in Great Britain but about how abolition might affect their overseas interests. In the end, merchants could continue trading slaves for 61 years after Lord Mansfield's decision. Commentators have argued that the decision's importance lay in the way it was portrayed at the time and later by the newspapers, with the assistance of a well-organised abolitionist movement.

Abolitionists argued that the law of England should apply on English ships even if not in the Colonies. Stewart's counsel, funded and encouraged by the slave merchants, argued that the consequence of a judgment in Somerset's favour might be to free the slaves in England, said to be 14,000 in number. As Lord Mansfield said in the case report, "The setting 14,000 or 15,000 men at once free loose by a solemn opinion is much disagreeable in the effects it threatens." He tried to persuade Stewart to settle by releasing Somerset and so avoid a decision, as he had done in other cases.

In 1780, Mansfield's house had been firebombed by a Protestant mob because of his judgements in support of rights for Catholics. In the Thames Ditton case, Lord Mansfield appeared to seek to limit the influence of the Somerset case.

Lord Mansfield freed Somerset by his ruling and did so in the face of the 1729 opinion of the Attorney-General and Solicitor-General, men whom Mansfield in the Somerset case described as "two of the greatest men of their own or any times". The prominence of the case emphasised the issues to the public. It was widely, and incorrectly, interpreted as ending slavery in Britain. Even Mansfield himself considered slavery to still be legal in Britain. When Mansfield died, his 1782 will granted his mulatto grand-niece, Dido Elizabeth Belle, her freedom, indicating that slavery continued to be legal.

Abolitionists considered this case to be Lord Mansfield's legacy and a watershed in the abolition of slavery. It is an example in English law of the maxim he quoted as a warning to the parties in the case before he began his months of deliberation, "Let justice be done though the heavens fall".

=== Influence in Great Britain and colonies ===
The Somerset case became a significant part of the common law of slavery in the English-speaking world, and helped launch a new wave of abolitionism. While Lord Mansfield's ruling contributed to the concept that slavery was contrary "both to natural law and the principles of the English Constitution", a position widely adopted by abolitionists, according to historians "the impairment to the legal status of slavery in the realm of England did not extend to the colonies."

The case of Knight v Wedderburn in Scotland began in 1774 and was concluded in 1778, with a ruling by the Court of Session that slavery was contrary to Scottish law. Some lawyers thought that similar determinations might be made in British colonies, which had clauses in their royal charters requiring their laws not to be contrary to the laws of England; they usually contained qualifications along the lines of "so far as conveniently may be". Activists speculated that the principles behind Lord Mansfield's decision might demand a rigorous definition of "conveniently", if a case were taken to its ultimate conclusion. Such a judicial ruling never took place as the Thirteen Colonies gained independence by 1783 and established laws related to slavery, with the northern states abolishing it, several gradually.

The Royal Navy began unilaterally interdicting the Atlantic slave trade in 1807 with the establishment of the West Africa Squadron. At its height slavery interdiction would take up a 6th of the Royal Navy's fleet and would interdict the African–Middle East slave trade.

Slavery in the rest of the British Empire continued until it was ended by the Slavery Abolition Act 1833. India was excluded from these provisions, as slavery was considered part of the indigenous culture and was not disrupted.

In 2026 the Jamaican government petitioned King Charles III to refer the question of Slavery's legality to the privy council. The petition is hinging the argument that slavery wasn't legal in England on the precedent of this case. This is seen as step towards forcing the British government to pay reparation for slavery to Caribbean nations

=== Thirteen Colonies and United States ===
The Somerset case was reported in detail by the American colonial press. In Massachusetts, several slaves filed freedom suits in 1773–1774 based on Mansfield's ruling; these were supported by the colony's General Court (for freedom of the slaves), but vetoed by successive Royal governors. As a result, some individuals in pro-slavery and anti-slavery colonies, for opposite reasons, desired a distinct break from English law in order to achieve their goals with regard to slavery.

Beginning during the Revolutionary War, Northern states began to abolish or rule against maintaining slavery. Vermont was the first in 1777, followed by Pennsylvania (1780), Massachusetts (1783) and Connecticut (1784). In Massachusetts, rulings related to the freedom suits of Brom and Bett v Ashley (1781) and Quock Walker (1783) in county and state courts, respectively, resulted in slavery being found irreconcilable with the new state constitution and ended it in the state. In this sense, the Walker case is seen as a United States counterpart to the Somerset Case. In the case of Quock Walker, Massachusetts' Chief Justice William Cushing gave instructions to the jury as follows, indicating the end of slavery in the state:

As to the doctrine of slavery and the right of Christians to hold Africans in perpetual servitude, and sell and treat them as we do our horses and cattle, that (it is true) has been heretofore countenanced by the Province Laws formerly, but nowhere is it expressly enacted or established. It has been a usage – a usage which took its origin from the practice of some of the European nations, and the regulations of British government respecting the then Colonies, for the benefit of trade and wealth. But whatever sentiments have formerly prevailed in this particular or slid in upon us by the example of others, a different idea has taken place with the people of America, more favorable to the natural rights of mankind, and to that natural, innate desire of Liberty, with which Heaven (without regard to color, complexion, or shape of noses-features) has inspired all the human race. And upon this ground our Constitution of Government, by which the people of this Commonwealth have solemnly bound themselves, sets out with declaring that all men are born free and equal – and that every subject is entitled to liberty, and to have it guarded by the laws, as well as life and property – and in short is totally repugnant to the idea of being born slaves. This being the case, I think the idea of slavery is inconsistent with our own conduct and Constitution; and there can be no such thing as perpetual servitude of a rational creature, unless his liberty is forfeited by some criminal conduct or given up by personal consent or contract ...

After the American Revolution, the Somerset decision "took on a life of its own and entered the mainstream of American constitutional discourse" and was important in anti-slavery constitutionalism.

In the Southern states, slavery was integral to the economy and expanded after the Revolution, due largely to the development of the cotton gin, making cultivation of short-staple cotton profitable as a commodity crop throughout the Deep South, in the early to mid-19th century.

== France and slavery ==
Somerset's case has been compared to the major French case on the same question, Jean Boucaux v Verdelin of 1738. Boucaux was born a slave in the French colony of Saint-Domingue (now Haiti). He was brought by his master Verdelin, an army sergeant, to France in 1728, where he served as his cook. After some years, Verdelin began to seriously mistreat Boucaux. The slave had married a French woman without Verdelin's consent, and the master had him imprisoned for fear that Boucaux would try to escape. Boucaux filed a freedom suit from prison, seeking confirmation of his free status in France. Following French practice, the arguments of the lawyers are recorded, but those for the judgment are not. The lawyers' arguments covered the whole history of the status of slavery in mainland France.

Boucaux won his case and was awarded back wages for the period of his work in France. Later that year, the national legislature passed a law to clarify some of the issues raised by the case. It did not abolish slavery in France. The law was implemented with regulations requiring the registration of slaves. The law provided that masters could bring colonial slaves to live and train in a "useful trade" in France for up to three years, without losing the right to return such slaves to servitude in the colonies. Other cases followed.

== See also ==
- Abolitionism in the United Kingdom
- Boone v Eyre (1777) — a subsequent Lord Mansfield judgement relating to condition precedent
- Forbes v Cochrane (1842)
- Pearne v Lisle (1749)
- Dred Scott v. Sandford (1857) — United States Supreme Court Ruling
- Little Ephraim Robin John and Ancona Robin John
- Ottobah Cugoano
- United Kingdom constitutional law
- United Kingdom labour law
- William Cushing

== Bibliography ==
- Blumrosen, Alfred W.; Blumrosen, Ruth G. (2005). Slave Nation: How Slavery United the Colonies & Sparked the American Revolution. Naperville: Sourcebooks. ISBN 9781402226113.
- Buehner, Henry Nicholas. Mansfieldism: Law and Politics in Anglo-America, 1700-1865 (PhD dissertation Temple University, 2014).
- Dziobon, Sheila. "Judge, jurisprudence and slavery in England 1729–1807", in Colonialism, Slavery, Reparations and Trade (2012): 185-210.
- Gerzina, Gretchen Holbrook. Black London: Life Before Emancipation (Rutgers University Press, 1997)
- Hulsebosch, Daniel J. "Nothing But Liberty: Somerset's Case and the British Empire", Law and History Review 24 (2006): pp. 547–557.
- Nadelhaft, Jerome (1966). "The Somersett Case and Slavery: Myth, Reality, and Repercussions". The Journal of Negro History. 51 (3): 193–208. doi:10.2307/2716061. JSTOR 2716061. S2CID 150260460.
- Paley, Ruth (2006). "Imperial Politics and English Law: The Many Contexts of 'Somerset'". Law and History Review. 24 (3): 659–664. doi:10.1017/S0738248000000833. JSTOR 27641406. S2CID 143983648.
- Watson, Alan (2006). "Lord Mansfield; Judicial Integrity or its Lack; Somerset's Case". Journal of Comparative Law. 1 (2): 225–234.
- Webb, Derek A. "The Somerset Effect: Parsing Lord Mansfield's Words on Slavery in Nineteenth Century America", Law & History Review 32 (2014): 455+.
- Wiecek, William M. "Somerset: Lord Mansfield and the Legitimacy of Slavery in the Anglo-American World", University of Chicago Law Review 42, No. 1 (1974): 86-146.
- Weiner, Mark S. (2002). "Notes and documents - New Biographical Evidence on Somerset's Case". Slavery & Abolition. 23 (1): 121–136. doi:10.1080/714005226. S2CID 144332627.
- Wise, Steven M. (2005). Though the Heavens May Fall: The Landmark Trial That Led to the End of Human Slavery. Da Capo Press. ISBN 0-7382-0695-4. Also published as Though the Heavens May Fall: James Somerset and the End of Human Slavery.
