= East India Company Ordinances =

Dutch laws on slavery in 1622

East India Company Ordinances were the Dutch laws on slavery in 1622.

The scarcity of references to the nightly trading sessions might indicate that there was some kind of private regulatory mechanism in place. The word collegie implies that the meetings had an official character, with some kind of committee that organized and chaired the meetings. It could well be that this committee also adjudicated conflicts. This point takes up a large part of chapter 3, but it is important to stress at this point that peer pressure and easy monitoring reduced the chances of reneging and hence of costly litigation.

With their legal personhood, permanent capital, transferable shares, separation of ownership and management, and limited liability, the Dutch and English colonial trading companies VOC and EIC are considered institutional breakthroughs. We analyze the VOC's business operations and financial policy and show that its novel corporate form owed less to foresight than to piecemeal engineering to remedy design flaws. The crucial feature of managerial limited liability was not, as previously thought, integral to that design, but emerged only after protracted experiments with various solutions to the company's financial bottlenecks.

Legal form followed economic function, not the other way around. Despite the presence of a central Asian headquarters in Batavia (modern Jakarta), even the numerous settlements of the Dutch East India Company or VOC (1602–1799) had separate administrations and record keeping. Second, unlike the Atlantic slave complex, European and preexisting indigenous forms of bondage seemingly shared many forms of similarities. Except for South Africa, European colonial powers took over and interacted with existing Indian Ocean systems of slavery, rather than imposing their own system in a relative vacuum as in the New World.
