= James Somerset =

Enslaved man

James Somerset (c. 1741 – after 1772) was an African man living in Britain and the plaintiff in a pivotal court case that confirmed that slavery was illegal in England and Wales.

== Biography ==
Somerset was born in West Africa around 1741. He was captured when he was about 8 years old and sold to European slave traders. On 10 March 1749 he was transported by British slave ship to the American Colony of Virginia, where Scottish merchant Charles Stewart bought Somerset on 1 August 1749. In 1764, Somerset was taken to Boston, where Stewart had been appointed Receiver General of Customs.

In November 1769, Stewart moved to England, taking Somerset along to serve him in his residence in London. In London, Somerset was baptised on 10 February 1771 at the Church of St Andrew, Holborn, with Thomas Walkin, Elizabeth Cade and John Marlow acting as his godparents. Perhaps because baptism was often associated with manumission, Somerset refused to continue serving Stewart, and left on 1 October of that year. Somerset lived in freedom for two months before he was kidnapped in November 1771 and forced aboard the Ann and Mary, captained by John Knowles, to be transported to Jamaica and sold.

His godparents, abolitionists, filed a Habeas corpus case with the courts and enlisted Granville Sharp to aid Somerset. The case, Somerset v Stewart, saw powerful interests arguing on both sides, as it challenged the legal basis of slavery in England and Wales. On 22 June 1772, the judge, Lord Mansfield, found in favour of Somerset. Mansfield had meant for the ruling to be narrowly construed around the legality of forcible deportation, only conceding by a 1679 statute that slaves are servants, and not chattels. Despite this, it was popularly taken to confirm that slavery was outlawed in England and Wales. Somerset himself appears to have adopted this broader interpretation, and wrote to at least one enslaved person encouraging them to desert their master.

Nothing is known of Somerset after 1772.

== See also ==
- Jonathan Strong (slave)
- Somerset v Stewart
- Abolitionism in the United Kingdom
- Slavery in the British Isles
