= Francis Hargrave =

English lawyer, judge and antiquary (c. 1741 – 1821)

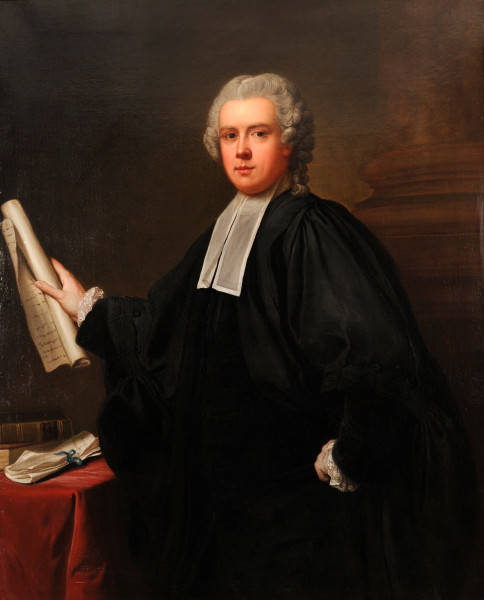
- Francis Hargrave
- Born: c. 1741; London
- Died: 1821
- Occupation: Lawyer
- Known for: Antiquary, Legal historian

Francis Hargrave (c.1741–1821) was an English lawyer and antiquary. He was the most prominent of the five advocates who appeared on behalf of James Somersett in the case which determined, in 1772, the legal status of slaves in England. Although the case was Hargrave's first, his efforts on the occasion secured his reputation.

== Life ==
Hargrave was born in London, the son of Christopher Hargrave of Chancery Lane. He entered as a student at Lincoln's Inn in 1760.

He came to prominence because of his performance in 1772, in Somersett's case, and shortly afterwards was made King's Counsel. Thereafter, he specialised in legal history and commentary and did not take further part in the abolitionist campaign. In 1797 he was made Recorder of Liverpool, and for many years was treasurer of Lincoln's Inn and a leading parliamentary lawyer.

He continued the celebrated compendium of State Trials begun by Thomas Salmon and Sollom Emlyn, which was later expanded by Thomas Bayly Howell.

He fell ill, in 1813, and his legal collection was purchased by the government for £8,000 and deposited in the British Museum. He died in 1821 and was buried in the chapel of Lincoln's Inn.

== Works ==
He published many works of legal history and amassed a substantial collection of legal books and manuscripts. His works were:

- An Argument in the case of James Sommersett, a Negro, wherein it is attempted to demonstrate the present unlawfulness of Domestic Slavery in England, 1772; 3rd edit. 1788. Also in Howell's 'State Trials,’ vol. xx.
- An Argument in Defence of Literary Property, 1774.
- Coke upon Lyttleton, edited by F. Hargrave and Charles Butler, 1775.
- State Trials from Henry IV to 19 George III, 1776, 11 vols.
  - A Complete Collection of State Trials, vol VII: 1549-1688
- A Collection of Tracts relative to the Law of England, from manuscripts by Hale, Norburie, Blackstone, Hargrave, and others, 1787.
- Opinion on the case of the Duke of Athol in respect of the Isle of Man, 1788.
- Brief Deductions relative to the Aid and Supply of Executive Power in cases of Infancy, Delirium, or other incapacity of the King, 1788, anonymous.
- Collectanea Juridica: consisting of Cases, Tracts, &c., 2 vols. 1791–2. This includes the manuscript on the Star Chamber left by William Hudson.
- Sir M. Hale's Jurisdiction of the Lords' House of Parliament, with Preface by F. H., 1796.
- Juridical Arguments and Collections, 1797–9, 2 vols. The arguments in the Thellusson will case were reprinted from this work separately in 1799, and a new edition by J. F. Hargrave was published in 1842.
- Address to the Grand Jury at the Liverpool Sessions on the present Crisis of Public Affairs, 1804.
- Jurisconsult Exercitations, 1811–13, 3 vols.

A catalogue of his manuscripts was compiled by Sir Henry Ellis, and published in 1818.
