= Forbes v Cochrane and Cockburn =

1824 English legal case regarding slavery

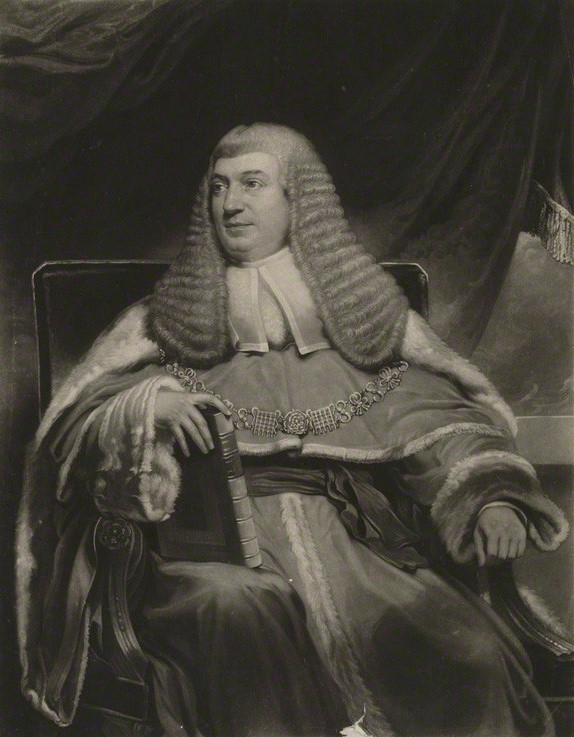
William Best, 1st Baron Wynford (1767-1845)

Forbes v Cochrane and Cockburn (1824) is a decision by the English Court of King's Bench which held that an enslaved person who escaped to a British Royal Navy ship outside the territorial waters of a slave-owning state became free. The case reinforced the legal principle that slavery was not recognized under English common law and established that British warships were treated as an extension of British soil ("floating territory") where English law applied.

== Background ==
The plaintiff, John Forbes, was a British merchant operating a plantation in East Florida, which was a Spanish colony at the time and legally permitted slavery. The defendants were Vice-Admiral Sir Alexander Cochrane, the commander-in-chief of the British Royal Navy North American Station, and Rear-Admiral Sir George Cockburn, his second in command.

In 1815, during the aftermath of the War of 1812, a group of individuals enslaved by Forbes escaped and sought refuge on board HMS Terror, a British bomb ship of the North American Station.

Forbes approached the British officers and demanded the return of what he considered his property. Admiral Cockburn allowed Forbes to board the ship to try and persuade the escapees to return with him peacefully. However, Cockburn outright refused to use naval personnel or force to compel them back into servitude. The fugitives chose to remain on the British ship.

Forbes sued Cochrane and Cockburn in the English courts in an action of trover—a common law tort claim used to recover the value of wrongfully taken or retained personal property.

== Judgment ==
At the initial trial in 1822 before Chief Justice Abbott in the Court of King's Bench, provisional judgment (a 'special verdict') was given for the plaintiff, and damages of £3800 were awarded, subject to the opinion of the court on the applicable law, to be decided by way of a later trial. In 1824, arguments on the law were heard by a bench of three judges, Sir John Bayley, Sir George Sowley Holroyd, and Sir William Draper Best. The judges ruled unanimously in favour of the defendants, Cochrane and Cockburn, and dismissed Forbes's claim.

The court recognized that a British warship on the high seas (outside the territorial waters of a foreign state) was subject exclusively to English law, functioning essentially as a floating piece of English territory. Drawing upon the precedent set by Lord Mansfield in Somerset v Stewart (1772), the court affirmed that English common law did not recognize or support the institution of slavery. Once the fugitives set foot on the British ship, they were considered as free as if they had been in England, and were no longer subject to Spanish colonial law. The moment they boarded the ship, British naval officers had no legal obligation—nor the authority—to forcefully return them to slavery. The defendants could not be held liable for trover because they were not illegally retaining Forbes's "property".

== Best J's opinion ==
Mr Justice Best delivered a particularly forceful opinion in the case, relying heavily on natural law. He asserted that slavery was inherently contrary to divine and natural justice. He stated that if human law contradicted divine law, the courts were bound to reject the human law. He proclaimed:

"Now if it can be shewn that slavery is against the law of nature and the law of God, it cannot be recognised in our Courts."

== Legacy ==
The ruling firmly established the legal right of British naval commanders to grant asylum to escaped enslaved persons who reached their ships on the high seas. This precedent was frequently cited in subsequent international disputes regarding fugitives.

The case successfully buried older, pro-slavery precedents (such as Butts v Penny), cementing the interpretation of Somerset's Case that slavery was legally incompatible with English common law.
