= List of cases involving Lord Mansfield =

This list of cases involving Lord Mansfield includes his major reported legal judgments, particularly during the time that Lord Mansfield served as the Lord Chief Justice of the English Court of the King's Bench from 1756 to 1788. He made historical contributions to the common law, particularly in declaring slavery to be unlawful, and in elaborating essential principles of good faith in the law of contracts.

== King's Bench ==
=== 1750s ===
- Robinson v Robinson (1756) 96 ER 999, Lord Mansfield's first case, holding a will effective if, even uncertainly, it does "manifest general intent"
- Cooper v Chitty (1756) 1 Burr 36, trover and conversion
- R v Richardson (1758) 97 ER 426, principles of representative accountability in companies

=== 1760s ===
- Moses v Macferlan (1760) 2 Burr 1005, unjust enrichment, or quasi-contract
- Pillans & Rose v Van Mierop & Hopkins (1765) 3 Burr 1663, irrelevance of consideration
- Carter v Boehm (1766) 3 Burr 1905, good faith principle in context of insurance
- Alderson v Temple (1768) 96 ER 384, on fraudulent preferences in insolvency aimed at equality
- Millar v Taylor (1769) 4 Burr. 2303, declaring a perpetual copyright, overruled by Donaldson v Becket (1774) 4 Burr 2408

=== 1770s ===
- Tinker v Poole (1770) 5 Burr 2657, conversion
- Somerset v Stewart (1772) 98 ER 499, illegality of slavery at common law
- Campbell v Hall (1774) 1 Cowp 204, tax and the Crown's authority in a colony
- Holman v Johnson (1775) 1 Cowp 341, the illegality policy in contract law
- Pierson v Dunlop (1777) Cowp. 571
- Bach v Longman (1777) 2 Cowper 623, copyright
- Da Costa v Jones (1778) 2 Cowp 729, on good faith in wagers
- R v Baillie (1778) criminal libel
- Pawson v Watson (1778) 2 Cowp 786, reasserting the general principle of good faith

=== 1780s ===
- Trial of Lord George Gordon (1781) high treason trial for Gordon riots against Catholics in London
- R v Shipley (1784) libel
- Forward v Pittard (1785) 1 Term Rep. 27, bailees

== See also ==
- English contract law
- UK copyright law
