= Insurance law =

Laws and regulations that relate to insurance

Insurance law is the practice of law surrounding insurance, including insurance policies and claims. It can be broadly broken into three categories – regulation of the business of insurance; regulation of the content of insurance policies, especially with regard to consumer policies; and regulation of claim handling.

== History ==
The earliest form of insurance is probably marine insurance, although forms of mutuality (group self-insurance) existed before that. Marine insurance originated with the merchants of the Hanseatic league and the financiers of Lombardy in the 12th and 13th centuries, recorded in the name of Lombard Street in the City of London, the oldest trading insurance market. In those early days, insurance was intrinsically coupled with the expansion of mercantilism, and the exploration (and exploitation) of new sources of gold, silver, spices, furs, and other precious goods - including slaves - from the New World. For these merchant adventurers, insurance was the "means whereof it comes to pass that upon the loss or perishing of any ship there followed not the undoing of any man, but the loss lighteth rather easily upon many than upon a few... whereby all merchants, especially those of the younger sort, are allured to venture more willingly and more freely."

The expansion of English maritime trade made London the centre of an insurance market that, by the 18th century, was the largest in the world. Underwriters sat in bars, or newly fashionable coffee-shops such as those run by Edward Lloyd on Lombard Street, considering the details of proposed mercantile "adventures" and indicating the extent to which they would share upon the risks entailed by writing their "scratch" or signature upon the documents shown to them.

At the same time, eighteenth-century judge William Murray, Lord Mansfield, was developing the substantive law of insurance to an extent where it has largely remained unchanged to the present day - at least insofar as concerns commercial, non-consumer business - in the common-law jurisdictions. Mansfield drew from "foreign authorities" and "intelligent merchants"

"Those leading principles which may be considered the common law of the sea, and the common law of merchants, which he found prevailing across the commercial world, and to which every question of insurance was easily referrable. Hence the great celebrity of his judgments, and hence the respect they command in foreign countries".

By the 19th century membership of Lloyd's was regulated and in 1871, the Lloyd's Act was passed, establishing the corporation of Lloyd's to act as a market place for members, or "Names". And in the early part of the twentieth century, the collective body of general insurance law was codified in 1904 into the Marine Insurance Act 1906, with the result that, since that date, marine and non-marine insurance law have diverged, although fundamentally based on the same original principles.

== Principles of insurance ==
Common law jurisdictions in former members of the British empire, including the United States, Canada, India, South Africa, and Australia ultimately originate with the law of England and Wales. What distinguishes common law jurisdictions from their civil law counterparts is the concept of judge-made law and the principle of stare decisis - the idea, at its simplest, that courts are bound by the previous decisions of courts of the same or higher status. In the insurance law context, this meant that the decisions of early commercial judges such as Mansfield, Lord Eldon and Buller bound, or, outside England and Wales, were at the least highly persuasive to, their successors considering similar questions of law.

At common law, the defining concept of a contract of commercial insurance is of a transfer of risk freely negotiated between counterparties of similar bargaining power, equally deserving (or not) of the courts' protection. The underwriter has the advantage, by dint of drafting the policy terms, of delineating the precise boundaries of cover. The prospective insured has the equal and opposite advantage of knowing the precise risk proposed to be insured in better detail than the underwriter can ever achieve. Central to English commercial insurance decisions, therefore, are the linked principles that the underwriter is bound to the terms of his policy; and that the risk is as it has been described to him, and that nothing material to his decision to insure it has been concealed or misrepresented to him.

In civil law countries, insurance has typically been more closely linked to the protection of the vulnerable, rather than as a device to encourage entrepreneurialism through the spreading of risk. Civil law jurisdictions - in very general terms - tend to regulate the content of the insurance agreement more closely, and more in the favour of the insured, than in common law jurisdictions, where the insurer is rather better protected from the possibility that the risk for which it has accepted a premium may be greater than that for which it had bargained. As a result, most legal systems worldwide apply common-law principles to the adjudication of commercial insurance disputes, whereby it is accepted that the insurer and the insured are more-or-less equal partners in the division of the economic burden of risk.

=== Insurable interest and indemnity ===
Most, and until 2005 all, common law jurisdictions require the insured to have an insurable interest in the subject matter of the insurance. An insurable interest is that legal or equitable relationship between the insured and the subject matter of the insurance, separate from the existence of the insurance relationship, by which the insured would be prejudiced by the occurrence of the event insured against, or conversely would take a benefit from its non-occurrence. Insurable interest was long held to be morally necessary in insurance contracts to distinguish them, as enforceable contracts, from unenforceable gambling agreements (binding "in honour" only) and to quell the practice, in the seventeenth and eighteenth centuries, of taking out life policies upon the lives of strangers. The requirement for insurable interest was removed in non-marine English law, possibly inadvertently, by the provisions of the Gambling Act 2005. It remains a requirement in marine insurance law and other common law systems, however; and few systems of law will allow an insured to recover in respect of an event that has not caused the insured a genuine loss, whether the insurable interest doctrine is relied upon, or whether, as in common law systems, the courts rely upon the principle of indemnity to hold that an insured may not recover more than his true loss.

=== Utmost good faith ===
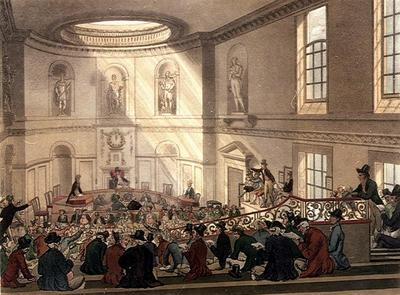
A strict duty of disclosure and good faith applies to selling most financial products, since Carter v Boehm where Lord Mansfield held an East India Company fort holder failed to warn the insurer of an impending French invasion. Such regulation did not extend to derivatives that contributed to the 2008 financial crisis.

The doctrine of uberrimae fides - utmost good faith - is present in the insurance law of all common law systems. An insurance contract is a contract of the utmost good faith. The most important expression of that principle, under the doctrine as it has been interpreted in England, is that the prospective insured must accurately disclose to the insurer everything that he knows and that is or would be material to the reasonable insurer. Something is material if it would influence a prudent insurer in determining whether to write a risk and, if so, upon what terms. If the insurer is not told everything material about the risk, or if a material misrepresentation is made, the insurer may avoid (or "rescind") the policy, i.e. the insurer may treat the policy as having been void from inception, returning the premium paid. Reinsurance contracts (between reinsurers and insurers/cedents) require the highest level of utmost good faith, and such utmost good faith is considered the foundation of reinsurance. In order to make reinsurance affordable, a reinsurer cannot duplicate costly insurer underwriting and claim handling costs, and must rely on an insurer's absolute transparency and candor. In return, a reinsurer must appropriately investigate and reimburse an insurer's good faith claim payments, following the fortunes of the cedent.

=== Warranties ===
In commercial contracts generally, a warranty is a contractual term, breach of which gives right to damages alone; whereas a condition is a subjectivity of the contract, such that if the condition is not satisfied, the contract will not bind. By contrast, a warranty of a fact or state of affairs in an insurance contract, once breached, discharges the insurer from liability under the contract from the moment of breach; while breach of a mere condition gives rise to a claim in damages alone.

== Regulation of insurance companies ==
Insurance regulation that governs the business of insurance is typically aimed at assuring the solvency of insurance companies. Thus, this type of regulation governs capitalization, reserve policies, rates and various other "back office" processes.

=== European Union ===
Member States of the European Union each have their own insurance regulators. However, the E.U. regulation sets a harmonised prudential regime throughout the whole Union. As they are submitted to harmonised prudential regulation and in consistency with the European Treaty (according to which any legal or natural person who is a citizen of a Union member state is free to establish him-, her- or itself, or to provide services, anywhere within the European Union), an insurer licensed in and regulated by e.g. the United Kingdom's financial services regulators, the Prudential Regulation Authority and the Financial Conduct Authority, may establish a branch in, and/ or provide cross-border insurance coverage (through a process known as "free provision of services") into, any other of the member states without being regulated by those states' regulators. Provision of cross-border services in this manner is known as "passporting".

=== India ===
The insurance sector went through a full circle of phases from being unregulated to completely regulated and then currently being partly deregulated. It is governed by a number of acts. The first statute in India to regulate the life insurance business was the Indian Life Assurance Companies Act, 1912. The Insurance Act of 1938 was the first legislation governing all forms of insurance to provide strict state control over insurance business. Life insurance in India was completely nationalized on January 19, 1956, through the Life Insurance Corporation Act. All 245 insurance companies operating then in the country were merged into one entity, the Life Insurance Corporation of India.

The General Insurance Business Act of 1972 was enacted to nationalise the about 100 general insurance companies then and subsequently merging them into four companies. All the companies were amalgamated into National Insurance, New India Assurance, Oriental Insurance and United India Insurance, which were headquartered in each of the four metropolitan cities.

Until 1999, there were no private insurance companies in India. The government then introduced the Insurance Regulatory and Development Authority Act in 1999, thereby de-regulating the insurance sector and allowing private companies. Furthermore, foreign investment was also allowed and capped at 26% holding in the Indian insurance companies. In 2015 the limit of FDI in insurance sector has been raised to 49% subject to certain conditions.

In 2006, the Actuaries Act was passed by parliament to give the profession statutory status on par with Chartered Accountants, Notaries, Cost & Works Accountants, Advocates, Architects and Company Secretaries. A minimum capital of US$80 million(₹ 400 Crore) is required by legislation to set up an insurance business.

=== United Kingdom ===
- Financial Services and Markets Act 2000

=== United States ===
As a preliminary matter, insurance companies are generally required to follow all of the same laws and regulations as any other type of business. This would include zoning and land use, wage and hour laws, tax laws, and securities regulations. There are also other regulations that insurers must also follow. Regulation of insurance companies is generally applied at State level and the degree of regulation varies markedly between States.

Regulation of the insurance industry began in the United States in the 1940s, through several United States Supreme Court rulings. The first ruling on insurance had taken place in 1868 (in the Paul v. Virginia ruling), with the Supreme Court ruling that insurance policy contracts were not in themselves commercial contracts and that insurance was not subject to federal regulation. This "judicial accident", as it has been called, influenced the development of state-level insurance regulation. This stance did not change until 1944 (in the United States v. South-Eastern Underwriters Association ruling), when the Supreme Court upheld a ruling stating that policies were commercial, and thus were regulatable as other similar contracts were.

In the United States each state typically has a statute creating an administrative agency. These state agencies are typically called the Department of Insurance, or some similar name, and the head official is the Insurance Commissioner, or a similar titled officer. The agency then creates a group of administrative regulations to govern insurance companies that are domiciled in, or do business in the state. In the United States regulation of insurance companies is almost exclusively conducted by the several states and their insurance departments. The federal government has explicitly exempted insurance from federal regulation in most cases.

In the case that an insurer declares bankruptcy, many countries operate independent services and regulation to ensure as little financial hardship is incurred as possible (National Association of Insurance Commissioners operates such a service in the United States).

In the United States and other relatively highly regulated jurisdictions, the scope of regulation extends beyond the prudential oversight of insurance companies and their capital adequacy, and include such matters as ensuring that the policy holder is protected against bad faith claims on the insurer's part, that premiums are not unduly high (or fixed), and that contracts and policies issued meet a minimum standard. A bad faith action may constitute several possibilities; the insurer denies a claim that seems valid in the contract or policy, the insurer refuses to pay out for an unreasonable amount of time, the insurer lays the burden of proof on the insured - often in the case where the claim is unprovable. Other issues of insurance law may arise when price fixing occurs between insurers, creating an unfair competitive environment for consumers. A notable example of this is where Zurich Financial Services - along with several other insurers - inflated policy prices in an anti-competitive fashion. If an insurer is found to be guilty of fraud or deception, they can be fined either by regulatory bodies, or in a lawsuit by the insured or surrounding party. In more severe cases, or if the party has had a series of complaints or rulings, the insurer's license may be revoked or suspended. Bad faith actions are exceedingly rare outside the United States. Even within the U.S. the full rigor of the doctrine is limited to certain states such as California.

=== Rest of World ===
Every developed sovereign state regulates the provision of insurance in different ways. Some regulate all insurance activity taking place within the particular jurisdiction, but allow their citizens to purchase insurance "offshore". Others restrict the extent to which their citizens may contract with non-locally regulated insurers. In consequence, a complicated muddle has developed in which many international insurers provide insurance coverage on an unlicensed or "non-admitted" basis with little or no knowledge of whether the particular jurisdiction in or into which cover is provided is one that prohibits the provision of insurance cover or the doing of insurance business without a licence.

== See also ==
- International Association of Insurance Supervisors
- Insurance broker and Insurance agent
- Agent of Record
- Australian insurance law
- Financial Conduct Authority - United Kingdom regulator of financial services (including insurance)
- National Association of Insurance Commissioners - United States organisation that coordinates insurance regulation
