= R v Richardson =

- Court: Court of King's Bench
- Citations: (1758) 97 ER 426, (1758) 1 Burr 517

Case opinions
- Lord Mansfield

Keywords
- Corporate governance, dismissal, directors, democracy, administrative law

R v Richardson (1758) 97 ER 426 is a foundational UK company law case, which established that companies had an inherent power to remove officials or directors for a reason. Lord Mansfield held, further, that only the members of the company itself (not a court) could determine the validity of the reasons.

== Facts ==
Nine portmen (like aldermen, but town councillors of a port city) of the chartered Corporation of Ipswich claimed in a writ of scire facias that they had been ejected wrongfully and therefore that the contemporary portman was an impostor. It was alleged that they had wilfully failed to attend "four occasional great Courts". These were yearly public meeting events at the "Moot Hall" to conduct the borough's business. It was alleged by the town's bailiffs that the portmen should have attended every meeting. There was a hearing where the portmen gave reasons for not attending. However the bailiffs did not accept them, and the portmen were dismissed. After the nine portmen had been dismissed, an election meeting was held, and a bailiff, Thomas Richardson was chosen. The dismissed portmen alleged this was unlawful, because their dismissals were improper and so there was no vacancy. They argued the dismissals were improper both because it was "not a removal by the whole body, at a corporate assembly: but by a particular Court", and also because the cause was not enough to justify removal by those bailiffs.

== Judgment ==
Lord Mansfield held that the portmen had been improperly dismissed, and so Richardson was not appointed as a new portman. The allegation was that the portmen had failed to attend meetings, a breach of a public duty. However, this could not in itself be a good reason for dismissal from office. Only the corporation as a whole could determine such a matter.

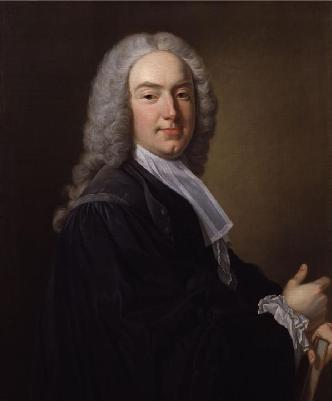
Portrait of William Murray by Jean-Baptiste van Loo, 1737. Lord Mansfield was the leading commercial lawyer of his age.

There are three sorts of offences for which an officer or corporator may be discharged.

1st. Such as have no immediate relation to his office; but are in themselves of so infamous a nature, as to render the offender unfit to execute any public franchise.

2d. Such as are only against his oath, and the duty of his office as a corporator; and amount to breaches of the tacit condition annexed to his franchise or office.

3d. The third sort of offence for which an officer or corporator may be displaced, is of a mixed nature; as being an offence not only against the duty of his office, but also a matter indictable at common law.

The distinction here taken, by my Lord Coke's report of this second resolution, seems to go to the power of trial, and not the power of amotion: and he seems to lay down, "that where the corporation has power by charter or prescription, they may try, as well as remove; but where they have no such power, there must be a previous conviction upon an indictment." So that after an indictment and conviction at common law, this authority admits, "that the power of amotion is incident to every corporation."

But it is now established, "that though a corporation has express power of amotion, yet, for the first sort of offences, there must be a previous indictment and conviction." And there is no authority since Bagg's case, which says that the power of trial as well as amotion, for the second sort of offences, is not incident to every corporation.

In Lord Bruce's case, 2 Strange, 819, the Court says, "the modern opinion has been, that a power of amotion is incident to the corporation."

We all think this modern opinion is right. It is necessary to the good order and government of corporate bodies, that there should be such a power, as much as the power to make bye-laws. Lord Coke says, "there is a tacit condition annexed to the franchise, which if he breaks, he may be disfranchised."

But where the offence is merely against his duty as a corporator, he can only be tried for it by the corporation. Unless the power is incident, franchises or offices might be forfeited for offences; and yet there would be no means to carry the law into execution.

Suppose a bye-law made "to give power of amotion for just cause," such bye-law would be good. If so, a corporation, by virtue of an incident power, may raise to themselves authority to remove for just cause, though not expressly given by charter or prescription.

The law of corporations was not so well understood, and settled, at the time of Bagg's case, as it has been since. And whether a power of amotion was incident to "the corporation," could be no part of the question in judgment in that case, or necessary to the determination of it. The power of amotion was there exercised by the select body; and the cause was insufficient; the offence not being any of the three kinds for which a corporator could be disfranchised. And the distinction there taken, as to the mode of trial, is certainly not law. For though the corporation has a power of amotion by charter or prescription, yet, as to the first kind of misbehaviours, which have no immediate relation to the duty of an office, but only make the party infamous and unfit to execute any public franchise: these ought to be established by a previous conviction by a jury, according to the law of the land; (as in cases of general perjury, forgery, or libelling, &c.).

We therefore think the Court was well warranted in Lord Bruce's case, to controvert the authority of the proposition, collected from what is said in Bagg's case, "that there can be no power of amotion, unless given by charter or prescription;" and we think that from the reason of the thing, from the nature of corporations, and for the sake of order and government, this power is incident, as much as the power of making bye-laws.

[... His Lordship then address the question whether the breach of the alleged public duty was a sufficient cause for removal by the bailiffs...]

There is not an officer or freeman in the kingdom, (who is a member of an assembly,) that might not be removed or disfranchised, if this doctrine was given way to. At times, every alderman, every common council-man, not necessary to the constitution of the assembly, knowingly omits attending.

It is not necessary, and would be highly improper at present, to say what kind of absence, or under what circumstances, non-attendance may be a cause of forfeiture. It is sufficient that the absence, with all the circumstances alleged by this plea, is not a cause.

And we are all of opinion that it is not.

== See also ==
- UK company law
- United States corporate law
- List of cases involving Lord Mansfield
