= Carter v Boehm =

English contract law

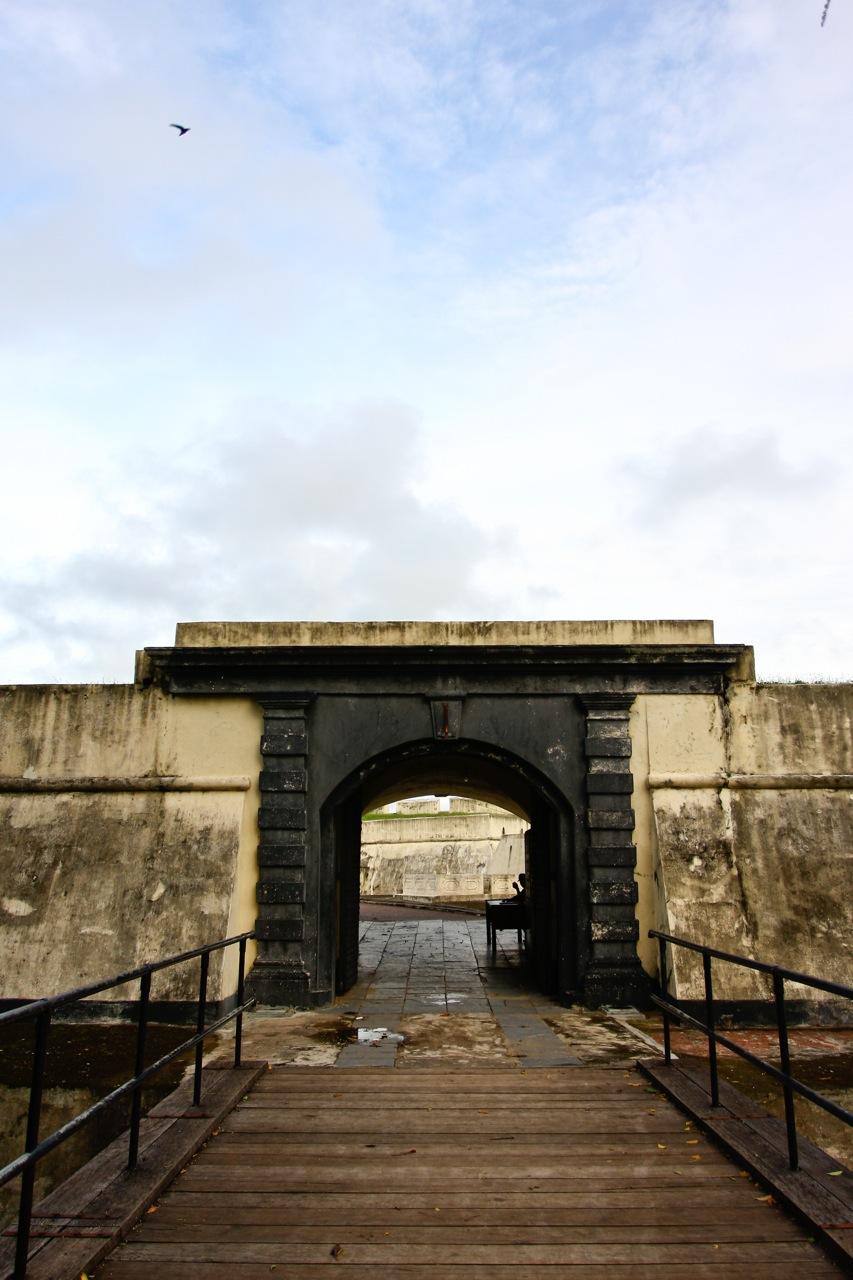
- Fort Marlborough, Indonesia
- Court: King's Bench
- Citation: (1766) 3 Burr 1905, (1766) 97 ER 1162

Case opinions
- Lord Mansfield

Carter v Boehm (1766) 3 Burr 1905 is a landmark English contract law case, in which Lord Mansfield established the duty of utmost good faith or uberrimae fidei in insurance contracts.

== Facts ==
Carter was the Governor of Fort Marlborough (now Bengkulu, Sumatra), built by the British East India Company. Carter took out an insurance policy with Boehm against the fort being taken by a foreign enemy. A witness, Captain Tryon, testified that Carter was aware that the fort was built to resist attacks from natives but would be unable to repel European enemies, and he knew the French were likely to attack. The French, led by Count D'Estaigne, successfully attacked, but Boehm refused to honour the indemnifier Carter, who promptly sued.

== Judgment ==
Lord Mansfield held that Mr Carter, as the proposer owed a duty of utmost good faith (uberrimae fidei) to the insurer, he was required to disclose all facts material to the risk:

Insurance is a contract based upon speculation. The special facts, upon which the contingent chance is to be computed, lie most commonly in the knowledge of the insured only; the underwriter trusts to his representation and proceeds upon the confidence that he does not keep back any circumstance in his knowledge, to mislead the underwriter into a belief that the circumstance does not exist, and to induce him to estimate the risk as if it did not exist. Good faith forbids either party by concealing what he privately knows, to draw the other into a bargain from his ignorance of that fact, and his believing the contrary.

Lord Mansfield went on to hold that the duty was reciprocal and that if an insurer withheld material facts, the example cited being that an insured vessel had already arrived safely, the policyholder could declare the policy void and recover the premium.

Lord Mansfield proceeded to qualify the duty of disclosure:

either party may be innocently silent, as to grounds open to both, to exercise their judgment upon.... An under-writer can not insist that the policy is void, because the insured did not tell him what he actually knew.... The insured need not mention what the under-writer ought to know; what he takes upon himself the knowledge of; or what he waives being informed of. The under-writer needs not be told what lessens the risque agreed and understood to be run by the express terms of the policy. He needs not to be told general topics of speculation.

Lord Mansfield found in favour of the policyholder on the grounds that the insurer knew or ought to have known that the risk existed as the political situation was public knowledge:

There was not a word said to him, of the affairs of India, or the state of the war there, or the condition of Fort Marlborough. If he thought that omission an objection at the time, he ought not to have signed the policy with a secret reserve in his own mind to make it void.

== Significance ==
In Manifest Shipping Co Ltd v Uni-Polaris Shipping Co Ltd John Hobhouse, Baron Hobhouse of Woodborough said,

As Lord Mustill points out, Lord Mansfield was at the time attempting to introduce into English commercial law a general principle of good faith, an attempt which was ultimately unsuccessful and only survived for limited classes of transactions, one of which was insurance. His judgment in Carter v Boehm was an application of his general principle to the making of a contract of insurance. It was based upon the inequality of information as between the proposer and the underwriter and the character of insurance as a contract upon a "speculation". He equated non-disclosure to fraud. He said at p 1909:

"The keeping back [in] such circumstances is a fraud, and therefore the policy is void. Although the suppression should happen through mistake, without any fraudulent intention; yet still the underwriter is deceived, and the policy is void."

It thus was not actual fraud as known to the common law but a form of mistake of which the other party was not allowed to take advantage. Twelve years later in Pawson v Watson (1778) 2 Cowp 786 at 788, he emphasised that the avoidance of the contract was as the result of a rule of law:

"But as, by the law of merchants, all dealings must be fair and honest, fraud infects and vitiates every mercantile contract. Therefore, if there is fraud in a representation, it will avoid the policy, as a fraud, but not as a part of the agreement."

== See also ==
- Da Costa v Jones (1778) 2 Cowp 729
- HIH Casualty and General Insurance Ltd v Chase Manhattan Bank Rix LJ stated, "I am conscious that in Carter v. Boehm itself Lord Mansfield does seem to have considered that there was a difference between the concealment which the duty of good faith prohibited and mere silence (‘Aliud est celare; aliud tacere…). As a result, non-disclosure in the insurance context in the early years was referred to as a ‘concealment’, and the doctrine has sometimes been viewed and explained as constructive fraud. However, Lord Mansfield was seeking to propound a doctrine of good faith which would extend through the law of contract, and in that respect his view did not bear fruit. Where, however, in the insurance context it put down firm roots, it came to be seen as a doctrine which went much further than the antithesis of fraud, and, as it came to be developed, “non-disclosure will in a substantial proportion of cases be the result of an innocent mistake."
- English contract law
- Good faith
- List of cases involving Lord Mansfield
