= Fraudulent Conveyances Act 1571 =

Act of the Parliament of England

- Act of Parliament
- Parliament of England
- Long title: An Act against Fraudulent Gifts.
- Citation: 13 Eliz. 1. c. 5

Dates
- Royal assent: 29 May 1571
- Commencement: 2 April 1571 (Note: Start of session.)
- Repealed: 1 January 1926
Other legislation
Amended by	Ecclesiastical Leases Act 1572; Continuance, etc. of Laws Act 1584; Continuance, etc. of Laws Act 1586; Statute Law Revision Act 1863; Statute Law Revision Act 1888
Repealed by	Law of Property Act 1925
Relates to	Statute of Bankrupts Act 1542; Fraudulent Conveyances Act 1584; Insolvency Act 1986

Status: Repealed

Text of statute as originally enacted

The Fraudulent Conveyances Act 1571 (13 Eliz. 1. c. 5), also known as the Statute of 13 Elizabeth, was an act of the Parliament of England, which laid the foundations for fraudulent transactions to be unwound when a person had gone insolvent or bankrupt.

Section 6 of the act (Note: Section 7 in The Statutes at Large.) provided that the act would remain in force until the end of the first session of the next parliament.

The act was continued until the end of the next session of parliament by the Ecclesiastical Leases Act 1572 (14 Eliz. 1. c. 11), the Continuance, etc. of Laws Act 1584 (27 Eliz. 1. c. 11) and made perpetual by the Continuance, etc. of Laws Act 1586 (29 Eliz. 1. c. 5)

In the United Kingdom, the provisions contained in the act were replaced by part IX of the Law of Property Act 1925 (15 & 16 Geo. 5. c. 20), which has since been replaced by part XVI of the Insolvency Act 1986.

== Text ==
For the avoiding of feigned, covinous and fraudulent feoffments, gifts, grants, alienations, bonds, suits, judgments and executions, as well of lands and in tenements, as of goods and chattels, more commonly used and practised in these days than hath been seen or heard of heretofore; which feoffments, gifts, grants etc have been and are devised and contrived of malice, fraud, covin, collusion or guile to the end, purpose and intent to delay, hinder or defraud creditors and others of their just and lawful actions, suits, debts, etc; not only to the let or hindrance of the due course and execution of law and justice, but also to the overthrow of all true and plain dealing, bargaining and chevisance between man and man, without the which no commonwealth or civil society can be maintained or continued.

Be it therefore declared, ordained and enacted, that all and every feoffment, gift, grant, alienation, bargain and conveyance of lands, tenements, hereditaments, goods and chattels, or any of them, by writing or otherwise, and all and every bond, suit, judgment and execution at any time had or made to or for any intent or purpose before declared and expressed, shall be from henceforth deemed and taken, only as against that person or persons, his or their heirs, successors, executors, administrators and signs of every of them, whose actions, suits, debts, etc; by such guileful, covinous or fraudulent devices and practices, as is aforesaid, are, shall or might be in anywise disturbed, hindered, delayed or defrauded, to be clearly and utterly void, frustrate, and of none effect, any pretence, color feigned consideration, expressing of use or any other matter or thing to the contrary notwithstanding.

Provided that this act or anything therein contained shall not extend to any estate or interest in land, tenements, hereditaments, leases, rents, commons, profits, goods or chattels, had, made, conveyed or assured, or hereafter to be had, made, conveyed or assured, which estate or interest is or shall be, upon good consideration and bona fide, lawfully conveyed or assured to any person or persons, or bodies politic or corporate, not having at the time of such conveyance or assurance to them made any manner of notice or knowledge of such covin, fraud or collusion as is aforesaid.

It is clear from the text of the statute that it was framed in a purposive manner. So if someone had the intention of defrauding a creditor, unless a transaction was made bona fide and for good consideration, it would be void.

== Historical background ==
In 1571, Parliament enacted this statute to prohibit transfers intended to defraud creditors or impede their collection efforts. This statute, known as the Statute of 13 Elizabeth, was passed in response to the widespread use of fraudulent transactions to defeat creditors. Until the 1600s, England had numerous sanctuaries not subject to the King's writ. These sanctuaries included churches but also certain areas defined by custom or royal grant. Debtors would often sell their property to friends or family at unreasonably low prices with the promise of buying it back later, move to a sanctuary, and then wait for creditors to exhaust their efforts or offer a favorable settlement.

== Cases under the act ==
- Alderson v Temple (1768) (1746–1779) 1 Black W 660, 96 ER 384, Lord Mansfield held the Act applied, not just to fraudulent conveyances, but also the granting of fraudulent preferences. He said a "fraudulent preference by a debtor, if made on the eve of, and followed by, the bankruptcy of the debtor, has been void against his creditors; because it aims at preventing that equal distribution of assets among the creditors, which has always been the object of those laws."
- Twyne's Case (1601) 3 Coke 80b, 76 ER 809 held that where a debtor tried to transfer title to property to another party but retained possession of it, that was repugnant to the act.
- Ideal Bedding v Holland [1907] 2 Ch 157, where Kekewich J noted that by virtue of subsequent enactments widening the potential relief available to creditors, the act had come to apply in a wide variety of circumstances which seemed to be wider than the original intended application as there was more potential for an action to constitute a hindrance upon that entitlement to relief.
- Trustee of the property of Pehrsson (a bankrupt) v Von Greyerz [1999] 4 LRC 135: in one of the most recent appellate decisions on the act, the Privy Council heard an appeal relating to the act from Gibraltar, where the act still applies.
- Curtis v Price (1806) 12 Ves 89; 33 ER 35; [1803–1813] All ER Rep 220
- Ryall v Rolle (1749) 1 Atk 165; 1 Wils 260; 1 Ves Sen 348; 9 Bli NS 377; 26 ER 107; [1558–1774] All ER Rep 82
- Daubeny v Cockburn (1816) 1 Mer 626; 35 ER 801; [1814–1823] All ER Rep 604
- Doe d Garnons v Knight (1826) 5 B & C 671; 8 Dow & Ry KB 348; 4 LJOSKB 161; 108 ER 250; [1824–1834] All ER Rep 414

== Subsequent developments ==
Sections 4 and 6 of the act were repealed by section 1 of, and the schedule to, the Statute Law Revision Act 1863 (26 & 27 Vict. c. 125), which came into force on 28 July 1863.

The whole act was repealed by section 207 of, and the seventh schedule to, the Law of Property Act 1925 (15 & 16 Geo. 5. c. 20).

== Other jurisdictions ==
=== United States ===
Many U.S. states enacted their own versions of the Statute of 13 Elizabeth after the American Revolution. The act was later superseded by the Uniform Fraudulent Conveyances Act of 1918 (UFCA), which in turn was superseded by the Uniform Fraudulent Transfer Act of 1984 (UFTA). To date, UFTA has been enacted in 43 states and the District of Columbia.

Both the Bankruptcy Act of 1938 and the Bankruptcy Reform Act of 1978 also included their own versions of the UFCA, thus ensuring that bankruptcy trustees can "avoid" (in other words, reverse) fraudulent transfers made by the bankrupt person within a certain time window before they filed for bankruptcy.

=== Commonwealth ===
The laws of England were incorporated into numerous of the colonies on specified dates. In Western Canada for example, the laws of England were incorporated as the laws of the Northwest Territories (now Saskatchewan, Alberta, the Northwest Territories and Nunavut) as at 1885. Although most former colonies have passed similar legislation, the 1571 Act may still be in effect in some jurisdictions. All Australian States and Territories and New Zealand received the Statute, and have equivalent provisions.

== See also ==
- Fraudulent conveyance
- UK insolvency law
- Statute of Bankrupts Act 1542
- Arbuthnot Leasing International Ltd v Havelet Leasing Ltd (No 2) [1990] BCC 36
