= Arbuthnot Leasing International Ltd v Havelet Leasing Ltd (No 2) =

Arbuthnot Ltd v Havelet Ltd (No 2)
- Court: High Court
- Citation: [1990] BCC 636

Keywords
- Voidable preference, undervalue transaction

Arbuthnot Leasing International Ltd v Havelet Leasing Ltd (No 2) [1990] BCC 636 is a leading UK insolvency law case, concerning a fraudulent transaction under the Insolvency Act 1986 section 423.

== Facts ==
Arbuthnot sought a declaration that Havelet Leasing Ltd, whose plane and coach hire business had gone insolvent, had defrauded its creditors by transferring its business, assets and contracts to the related Havelet Leasing Finance Ltd. Arbuthnot had financed part of Havelet's business, and it owned some of the vehicles which were leased to Havelet. When Havelet fell into arrears, Arbuthnot obtained a judgment and appointed a receiver. They then found that Havelet had transferred its business, assets and benefits of all Havelet's agreements to a third company (Havelet Leasing Finance Ltd). Havelet's lessees were paying Havelet Leasing Finance, which in turn paid Havelet in quarterly arrears. This was contended to be a fraudulent scheme to elevate the owner of Havelet in priority after insolvency.

== Judgment ==
Scott J held that the transfer would be reversed, that all assets in Havelet Leasing Finance's possession were held on trust for Havelet, without prejudice to Havelet Leasing Finance's creditors. He said that although the motive was not necessarily dishonest (on the basis that Havelet's lawyers had advised Havelet that it was not), the purpose of the transfer was to put the assets out of Arbuthnot's reach, it was still done with the purpose of putting assets beyond creditors' reach and thus was a fraudulent transaction and void.

Scott J's judgment set out as follows.

I have lost count – and I hope those in court will forgive me for not trawling through my notebook to produce an accurate count – of the number of days that the hearing of this matter has involved. Over the many weeks since the action was commenced and for the purposes of the numerous interlocutory applications made therein, a very large number of affidavits have been sworn. On Mr Maughan’s side affidavits have been sworn by himself and by a co-director of his, Mr Hart, who was in charge of the financial side of the Havelet business. Affidavits have been sworn on behalf of Arbuthnot. Since the appointment of administrators under an administration order in respect of Leasing, affidavits have been sworn on behalf of the administrators. A volume of evidence has been built up. Files run from A down to G. There are in addition loose documents littering the desk in front of me, consisting of a number of recent affidavits which have been sworn by Mr Maughan additional to those in the bundles.

All of this material has been generated in connection with interlocutory applications and before the trial of any issue has taken place. The costs already incurred by these interlocutory applications must be very high. The cost of the administration order regime in connection with Leasing is going to be very high. That is not intended to be any sort of criticism of the administrators; it is one of the facts of life that professionals, whether they are solicitors, barristers or accountants, charge high fees. So, inevitably, the costs of the administration will be heavy…

Nobody must think, and I am sure Mr Maughan does not think, that that disposes of the litigation in its entirety. Arbuthnot retains proprietary claims. I have no view on those and express none. There may be misfeasance claims against Mr Maughan himself: I have not referred to evidence about various bonus payments that he received from Leasing. I express no view on those matters either. All I am concerned with at the moment is to make an order under sec. 423 so as to reverse the improper transfers of assets from Leasing to Finance...

Mr Maughan stressed in his submissions to me and in the affidavit to which I have just referred that what he did he did on legal advice from solicitors and counsel and without any dishonest intent. I accept – because he has not been cross-examined on his affidavits – that evidence. It does not, however, seem to me that it is by itself an answer to a sec. 423 application. Subsection (3) refers to the requirement, if relief under the section is to be granted, that the court must be satisfied that the transaction was entered into for the purpose of putting assets beyond the reach of a person who is making, or may at some time make, a claim against the company. The fact that lawyers may have advised that the transaction is proper or can be carried into effect does not by itself mean that the purpose of the transaction was not the subsec. (3) purpose. It seems to me that, beyond any argument, that was the purpose for which these transactions were made. Mr Maughan formed the view that the litigation against Leasing and the judgments that were liable to be obtained would ruin Leasing's business and would be detrimental to Leasing's creditors, not simply Arbuthnot but the other banks as well. Mr Maughan's motive of saving Leasing's business was not necessarily a dishonest motive, but is consistent with an intention to put Leasing's assets out of the reach of Arbuthnot. But for the transfers that Mr Maughan put into effect. Leasing would have had a business and assets to which recourse could have been had in satisfaction or part-satisfaction of the judgment debt that, at the time of the transfers, Arbuthnot was seeking and that shortly thereafter it succeeded in obtaining. Execution against those assets probably would, I accept, have done very great damage to Leasing's business. It may have done damage also to the underlying interests of the other creditors, such as the other banks. But, nonetheless, Leasing's assets were deliberately put out of the reach of Arbuthnot. The only asset left against which execution could be levied was Leasing's right to receive quarterly-in-arrears payments from Finance.

Was the transaction at an undervalue? Subsection (1) provides that a transaction is at an undervalue if the consideration is “significantly less than the value, in money or money's worth, of the consideration provided” by the transferor. The consideration provided by the transferor in respect of the transfers of the LPs was the benefit of the income stream. The consideration coming back to Leasing consisted of the quarterly-in-arrears payments. In addition, the capital assets of Leasing, apart from the LPs, were transferred to Finance for the purpose of enabling Finance to carry on an ongoing business. It is right, in my judgment, to regard the transactions whereby Leasing's business was transferred to Finance as one transaction. This transaction was, in my judgment, a transaction at an undervalue within the meaning of that expression in subsec. (1) of sec. 423 .

== See also ==
- UK insolvency law
- Fraudulent Conveyances Act 1571, repealed by Law of Property Act 1925 s 172, though kept through the insolvency legislation, now Insolvency Act 1986 s 423
- Alderson v Temple (1768) 96 ER 384
