= Portrait of Lord Mansfield =

Painting by John Singleton Copley

Lord Mansfield
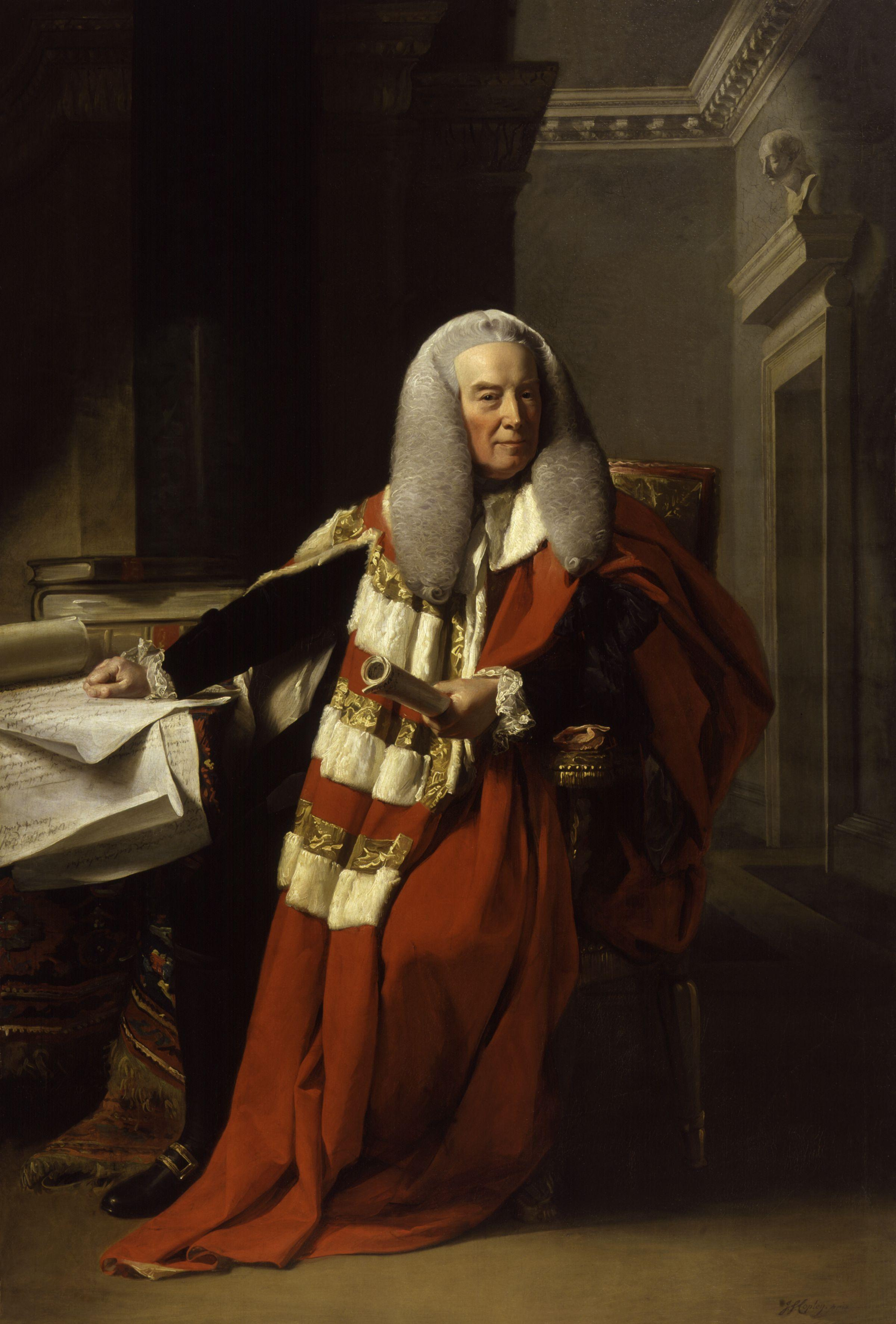
- Artist: John Singleton Copley
- Year: 1783
- Type: Oil on canvas, portrait
- Dimensions: 228 cm × 149 cm (89.6 in × 58.6 in)
- Location: National Portrait Gallery; London

The Portrait of Lord Mansfield is a 1783 portrait painting by the Anglo-American artist John Singleton Copley. It depicts the Scottish politician and lawyer William Murray, 1st Earl of Mansfield who was serving as Lord Chief Justice at the time. He is shown in his robes as a member of the House of Lords where he sat as the Earl of Mansfield.

Mansfield had a long career in politics and the legal profession but is today best known for his ruling in several rulings restricting the practice of slavery notably the 1772 Somerset Case in which he freed a slave from his owner, observing that slavery had no place in the common law of the nation. The year Copley painted him he made a major ruling in the case of the Zong slave-trading ship. Mansfield's own great-niece Dido Elizabeth Belle was a daughter of an enslaved woman.

Copley was an American artist who emigrated to Britain in 1774 and enjoyed success with his history paintings, although he continued to produce portraits. A few years earlier Copley had depicted Mansfield as one of many figures in his large work The Death of Lord Chatham.

As well as wearing his robes, Mansfield's legal office is also suggested by the documents in front of him. In the background is a bust of the writer Alexander Pope, who Mansfield had been friends with in his youth and who mentioned him in his Imitation of Horace's Epistle. Commissioned by the judge Sir Sir Francis Buller but ended up in the possession of the artist's son Lord Lyndhurst, who himself reached the top of the British legal profession, serving three times as Lord Chancellor. Today it is in the collection of the National Portrait Gallery in London.

== See also ==
- Portrait of William Murray, a 1737 portrait by Jean-Baptiste van Loo
- Dido Elizabeth Belle and Lady Elizabeth Murray, 1778 painting by David Martin

== Bibliography ==
- Byrne, Paula. Belle: The Slave Daughter and the Lord Chief Justice. HarperCollins, 2014.
- Kamensky, Jane. A Revolution in Color: The World of John Singleton Copley. W. W. Norton & Company, 2016.
- Poser, Norman S. Lord Mansfield: Justice in the Age of Reason. McGill-Queen's Press, 2013.
- Prown, Jules David. John Singleton Copley: In England, 1774–1815. National Gallery of Art, Washington, 1966.
