= Tunneling (fraud) =

Type of financial fraud

Tunneling or tunnelling is financial fraud committed by "the transfer of assets and profits out of firms for the benefit of those who control them". In legal terms, this is known as a fraudulent transfer, such as when a group of major shareholders or the management of a publicly traded company orders that company to sell off its assets to a second company at unreasonably low prices. The shareholders or management typically own the second company outright, and thus profit from the otherwise disastrous sale. Tunneling differs from outright theft because people who engage in tunneling generally comply with all of the relevant legal procedures; it is thus a subtler scheme than simply writing checks from a company to a private bank account. While people widely agree that tunneling is unethical, penalties for it vary widely; some states impose criminal sanctions, whereas other states provide either for civil suits only, or for no sanctions at all.

== Origin ==
The word tunneling was probably first used in this way in the Czech Republic (tunelování in Czech, tunelář for the person committing fraud) during the first half of the 1990s, when several large, previously privatised banks and factories unexpectedly went bankrupt. It was discovered later that the managements of these companies were deliberately transferring company property and real estate into their own private businesses, sometimes in offshore locations.

The term became a common label for this kind of criminal activity among Czechs and Slovaks. The term subsequently appeared in specialized literature in English, and then in a broader literature during the Asian financial crisis in the late 1990s.

== Examples ==
The most common scheme in Central Europe in the post-privatization era was transferring funds and property from high cash flow corporations to companies privately owned by the very same management. Transfers were accomplished via huge loans that were issued without any expectation of repayment, via massive overpayment for outsourced services, or simply by selling a corporation's real estate for a fraction of its market price. The main conditions enabling such a fraud is weak law against conflict of interests, non-existent legal liability of managers for leading their employer towards bankruptcy, and incompetence of financial authorities.

A typical example was the huge industrial complex Škoda Works in Plzeň, Czech Republic, which was tunneled by its top manager. The fraud, together with failures in management strategy, resulted in bankruptcy (2001) and then restructuring of the company. The manager was later acquitted by a court, which claimed that "such practices were common at the time".

Typical 7-step tunneling process

1. Identify and incentivise a trusted company 'insider', usually in the finance dept, that will be willing to trample over company compliance and authorisations—and enter secretly into a loan/loans—with a person 'outside' of the company. 'Granting' a partial or a full 'security' over some of, or over the assets, or over the entire business and all of its assets.
2. Rapidly run down the cash in the company, usually by buying and holding in inventory equipment and stock—that is unnecessary at that time.
3. At short (sometimes only 24–48 hours) notice, announce that the company is 'insolvent'—and have the company immediately forced into a bankruptcy process.
4. The only 'main creditor' is of course the local 'outsider'—who dominates a rapidly assembled 'creditors committee'—which similarly rapidly agrees to sell some or all of the company assets to a holding company that they already control.
5. Knowing that the original owners are eventually likely to seek justice and also the re-establishment of ownership of their assets, the 'tunnelers' next typically pay a local Police Dept officer, to file (knowingly false) 'charges'—against the original owner of the company—usually by claiming that a 'loan' or 'loans' (which the original owners were entirely unaware of!) were 'taken, with no intention of repaying them'.
6. The 'tunnelers' typically pay a local Local/Regional Court official, to:
  - accept the knowingly false 'charges'
  - hold 'Court Hearings', without serving any formal Notice on the victim—the original owners
  - gain 'convictions' against the original owners.
7. The 'tunneler' next offers a 'Settlement Agreement'—under which:
  - they get to keep all of the misappropriated assets, that they have 'legitimately' purchased from the 'creditor's committee'.
  - they have a clause included, whereby the original owner agrees to waive all rights—to ever sue the 'tunnelers' in the future.
  - the 'tunnelers' agree to retract all of the knowing false claims and allegations—that they made against the original owner—thereby quashing all any 'convictions' or ongoing legal proceedings.

Academic sources for learning more about tunneling include "The Law and Economics of Self-Dealing," by Djankov et al. at the National Bureau of Economic Research.

== See also ==
- Asset stripping
- Fraudulent conveyance
