= Twyne's Case =

UK insolvency law case

Twyne's case
- Court: Star Chamber
- Citation: (1601) 3 Coke 80; (1601) 76 ER 809

Keywords
- Fraudulent conveyance

Twyne's case (1601) 76 ER 809; 3 Co. Rep. 80b is a UK insolvency law case, concerning a fraudulent conveyance. Representative of earlier English law, it was considered that any transfer of property from a debtor to a creditor, after which the debtor remained in possession of that property, was a fraudulent act intended to defraud creditors. At the time, the law only recognised the mortgage and the pledge. A charge on property in possession of another was not allowed.

== Facts ==
Pierce, a farmer, owed Twyne of Hampshire £400. He also owed another creditor £200, and this creditor brought an action. While the writ was pending, Pierce sold his sheep to Twyne to pay off his debt. However, Pierce remained in possession of the sheep, marking and shearing them. At the other creditor's instance, the Sheriff of Southampton came to collect the sheep. Twyne and his acquaintances resisted this. Twyne argued that he was a bona fide purchaser for valuable, and not inadequate, consideration within the Fraudulent Conveyances Act 1584 (27 Eliz. 1. c. 4).

== Judgment ==
The Star Chamber (Sir Thomas Egerton, Chief Justice Popham and Anderson) held this was an attempt to defraud his creditors under the Fraudulent Conveyances Act 1571. The following reasons were given.

1st. That this gift had the signs and marks of fraud, because the gift is general, without exception of his apparel, or any thing of necessity; for it is commonly said, quod dolus versatur in generalibus. (Note: 'That a deceiver deals in generalities'.)

2nd. The donor continued in possession, and used them as his own; and by reason thereof he traded and trafficked with others, and defrauded and deceived them.

3rd. It was made in secret, et dona clandestina sunt semper suspiciosa. (Note: 'And secret gifts are always suspicious'.)

4th. It was made pending the writ

5th. Here was a trust between the parties, for the donor possessed all, and used them as his proper goods, and fraud is always apparelled and clad with a trust, and a trust is the cover of fraud.

6th. The deed contains, that the gift was made honestly, truly, and bona fide: et clausulæ inconsuet' semper inducunt suspicionem. (Note: 'And hidden clauses always provoke suspicion'.)

It was further held that the gift may have been on good consideration, but could not be bona fide.

the intent of the Act was, that the consideration in such case should be valuable; for equity requires, that such gift, which defeats others, should be made on as high and good consideration as the things which are thereby defeated are...

== See also ==
- English land law
- English property law
- WNWO-TV
