= Agent of record =

Insurance term

In insurance, an agent of record (AOR) is an individual or legal entity, an agent, that represents an insurance policy holder and typically receives commissions on the premiums.

The agent of record is authorized to represent an insured party in purchasing, servicing, and maintaining insurance coverage with a designated insurer. The majority of insurance companies will not disclose information or discuss an insured party's account with an agent other than the agent of record. An insured party wishing to change its insurance agent must authorize the insurer to release their information and discuss their coverage with their newly appointed agent, for example with an agent of record letter.

== See also ==
- Insurance law
- Principle of legality in criminal law
