= Thomas Denison =

British judge (1699–1765)

Sir Thomas Denison (1699 – 8 September 1765) was a British judge.

Born in Leeds, a city in West Yorkshire, England). Denison's father William was a clothier described as "an opulent merchant at Leeds". Denison, the younger of two sons, was educated at the Leeds Grammar School, and entered the Inner Temple in 1718 to receive his legal education; he was thereafter called to the bar.

He was successful as a lawyer, and in December 1741, he was appointed to succeed Sir Francis Page on the Court of the King's Bench, taking office on 16 February 1742. He served in that capacity for over twenty-three years, under chief justices, Sir William Lee, Sir Dudley Ryder, and Lord Mansfield, resigning on 14 February 1765 on the account of poor health and failing eyesight.

He died in September that year and was buried in Harewood in Yorkshire. Per his instruction, Denison was buried next to admired former Chief Justice William Gascoigne; a memorial was erected in his honor with an inscription by his closest friend, Lord Mansfield.

Denison had no children. His wife, Anne, daughter of Robert Smithson, Esq., died twenty years later, and his estate passed to his wife's grand-niece, who married Edmund the fifth son of Sir John Beckett, Bart. who then assumed the name of Denison. Denison's grand-nephew, John Evelyn Denison, would become speaker of the House of Commons in the 1800s.
