= Fraudulent conveyance =

Property transfer to hinder debt collection

A fraudulent conveyance or fraudulent transfer is the transfer of property to another party to prevent, hinder, or delay the collection of a debt owed by or incumbent on the party making the transfer, sometimes by rendering the transferring party insolvent. It is generally treated as a civil cause of action that arises in debtor/creditor relations, typically brought by creditors or by bankruptcy trustees against insolvent debtors, but in some jurisdictions there is potential for criminal prosecution.

== Overview ==
A transfer will be fraudulent if made with actual intent to hinder, delay, or defraud any creditor. Thus, if a transfer is made with the specific intent to avoid satisfying a specific liability, then actual intent is present. However, when a debtor prefers to pay one creditor instead of another, that is not a fraudulent transfer.

There are two types of fraudulent transfer—actual fraud and constructive fraud. Actual fraud typically involves a debtor who as part of an asset protection scheme donates his assets, usually to an "insider", and leaves himself nothing to pay his creditors. Constructive (i.e., inferential) fraud does not relate to fraudulent intent, but rather to the underlying economics of the transaction, if it took place for less than reasonably equivalent value at a time when the debtor was in a distressed financial condition. The actual distinction between the two different types of fraud is what the intentions of the debtor were. For example, where the debtor has simply been more generous than they should have or, in business transactions, the business should have ceased trading earlier to preserve capital (see, generally, wrongful trading), a court may deem the fraud constructive rather than actual. In a successful lawsuit, the plaintiff is entitled to recover the property transferred or its value from the transferee who has received a gift of the debtor's assets. Subsequent transferees may also be targeted, although they generally have stronger defenses than immediate transferees.

Although fraudulent transfer law originally evolved in the context of a relatively simple agrarian economy, it is now widely used to challenge complex modern financial transactions such as leveraged buyouts.

Fraudulent transfer liability will often turn on the financial condition of the debtor at a particular point in the past. This analysis has historically required "dueling" expert testimony from both plaintiffs and defendants, which often led to an expensive process and inconsistent and unpredictable results. Courts and scholars have recently developed market-based approaches to try to make this analysis simpler, more consistent across cases, and more predictable.

=== Badges of fraud ===
Evidence of actual intent is rarely available to a creditor for it would require proof of someone’s inner thoughts. Because of that, creditors often have to rely on circumstantial evidence of fraud. To prove actual intent, the courts have developed "badges of fraud", which, while not conclusive, are considered by the courts as circumstantial evidence of fraud:

- becoming insolvent because of the transfer;
- lack or inadequacy of consideration;
- family or insider relationship among parties;
- the retention of possession, benefits or use of property in question;
- the existence of the threat of litigation;
- the financial situation of the debtor at the time of transfer or after transfer;
- the existence or a cumulative effect of a series of transactions after the onset of debtor’s financial difficulties;
- the general chronology of events;
- secrecy of the transaction in question; and
- deviation from the usual method or course of business.

== Individual jurisdictions ==
=== Australia ===
Under Australian law, if a transaction is entered into by a company which subsequently goes into liquidation, and the transaction was entered into by the company for the purpose of defeating, delaying or interfering with the rights of creditors during the 10 years prior to the relation back day, the courts may set it aside. The relation-back day is defined as either the day upon which the application for the company's winding-up was filed, or the date of the commencement of liquidation.

=== Canada ===
Canadian provinces have jurisdiction over property and civil rights, which includes conveyances of property. Many provinces have statutes prohibiting fraudulent conveyances. They also prohibit the granting of fraudulent preferences, which purport to give certain creditors priority over other creditors in bankruptcy. However, bona fide purchasers for value without notice are generally not liable for the actions of the fraudulent conveyer.

=== United Kingdom ===
- Fraudulent Conveyances Act 1571 (repealed by the Law of Property Act 1925)
- Insolvency Act 1986 section 423

=== United States ===
In Anglo-American law, the doctrine of Fraudulent Conveyance traces its origins back to Twyne's Case, in which an English farmer attempted to defraud his creditors by selling his sheep to a man named Twyne, while remaining in possession of the sheep, marking and shearing them. In the United States, fraudulent conveyances or transfers are governed by two sets of laws that are generally consistent. The first is the Uniform Fraudulent Transfer Act ("UFTA") that has been adopted by all but a handful of the states. The second is found in the Federal Bankruptcy Code.

The UFTA and the Bankruptcy Code both provide that a transfer made by a debtor is fraudulent as to a creditor if the debtor made the transfer with the "actual intention to hinder, delay or defraud" any creditor of the debtor.

There are two kinds of fraudulent transfer. The archetypal example is the intentional fraudulent transfer. This is a transfer of property made by a debtor with intent to defraud, hinder, or delay his or her creditors. The second is a constructive fraudulent transfer. Generally, this occurs when a debtor transfers property without receiving "reasonably equivalent value" in exchange for the transfer if the debtor is insolvent at the time of the transfer or becomes insolvent or is left with unreasonably small capital to continue in business as a result of the transfer. Unlike the intentional fraudulent transfer, no intention to defraud is necessary.

The Bankruptcy Code authorizes a bankruptcy trustee to recover the property transferred fraudulently for the benefit of all of the creditors of the debtor if the transfer took place within the relevant time frame. The transfer may also be recovered by a bankruptcy trustee under the UFTA too, if the state in which the transfer took place has adopted it and the transfer took place within its relevant time period. Creditors may also pursue remedies under the UFTA without the necessity of a bankruptcy.

Because this second type of transfer does not necessarily involve any actual wrongdoing, it is a common trap into which honest, but unwary debtors fall when filing a bankruptcy petition without an attorney. Particularly devastating and not uncommon is the situation in which an adult child takes title to the parents' home as a self-help probate measure (in order to avoid any confusion about who owns the home when the parents die and to avoid losing the home to a perceived threat from the state). Later, when the parents file a bankruptcy petition without recognizing the problem, they are unable to exempt the home from administration by the trustee. Unless they are able to pay the trustee an amount equal to the greater of the equity in the home or the sum of their debts (either directly to the Chapter 7 trustee or in payments to a Chapter 13 trustee), the trustee will sell their home to pay the creditors. In many cases, the parents would have been able to exempt the home and carry it safely through a bankruptcy if they had retained title or had recovered title before filing.

Even good faith purchasers of property who are the recipients of fraudulent transfers are only partially protected by the law in the U.S. Under the Bankruptcy Code, they get to keep the transfer to the extent of the value they gave for it, which means that they may lose much of the benefit of their bargain, even though they have no knowledge that the transfer to them is fraudulent.

Often fraudulent transfers occur in connection with leveraged buyouts (LBOs), where the management/owners of a failing corporation will cause the corporation to borrow on its assets and use the loan proceeds to purchase the management/owner's stock at highly inflated prices. The creditors of the corporation will then often have little or no unencumbered assets left upon which to collect their debts. LBOs can be either intentional or constructive fraudulent transfers, or both, depending on how obviously the corporation is financially impaired when the transaction is completed.

Although not all LBOs are fraudulent transfers, a red flag is raised when, after an LBO, the company then cannot pay its creditors.

Fraudulent transfer liability will often turn on the financial condition of the debtor at a particular point in the past. This analysis has historically required "dueling" expert testimony from both plaintiffs and defendants, which often led to an expensive process and inconsistent and unpredictable results. U.S. courts and scholars have recently developed market-based approaches to try to streamline the analysis of constructive fraud, and judges are increasingly focusing on these market based measures.

=== Switzerland ===
Under Swiss law, creditors who hold a certificate of unpaid debts against the debtor, or creditors in a bankruptcy, may file suit against third parties that have benefited from unfair preferences or fraudulent transfers by the debtor prior to a seizure of assets or a bankruptcy.

=== South Korea ===
Fraudulent conveyance or also known as action revocatoire or Pauline action (채권자취소권) is a right to preserve the debtor's property for all creditors by canceling an action by the debtor which reduces the debtor's property with a knowledge that the action harms the rights of the creditor. To exercise this right, the creditor must have a right against the debtor that is monetary and not unique and personal in nature. For instance, the right to demand to clear of the land of the building or the right to delivery the land involves land and unique and therefore not subject to Pauline action (Supreme Court of South Korea, February 10, 1995, 94da2534).

== See also ==
- Bayou Hedge Fund Group
- Fraudulent Conveyances Act 1571
- Bernie Madoff
- United Kingdom insolvency law
- Tunneling (fraud)
