= Da Costa v Jones =

English contract law case

- Court: King's Bench
- Citation: (1778) 2 Cowp 729

Court membership
- Judge sitting: Lord Mansfield

Da Costa v Jones (1778) 2 Cowp 729 is a landmark English contract law case.

== Facts ==
A wager was made on the sex of a certain individual.

The individual concerned was a French national known as Monsieur le Chevalier D'Eon. D'Eon was a captain in the Dragoons and had served France in diplomatic postings firstly in Russia and later in England. He had been awarded the Cross of Saint-Louis during the reign of Louis XV in recognition of his service in the Dragoons and his diplomatic work. In the reign of Louis XV, the king established a spy service which was known as the Secret. The existence of Secret was not known to the king's ministers: It reported directly to him.

During his time in England he fell out of favour with two of the king's ministers (a dispute having started over the level of his expenses), leading to his replacement by another diplomat. He continued to serve his country as a spy and therefore reported indirectly to the king. He held concerns that if he were to return to France he could have been imprisoned on the Bastille. Over time, he made comments which threw doubt on his true sex. Being well known in London, comments about his sex became the subject of talk and comment in the press. In turn this led to numerous wagering contracts being entered into.

The wager in the Da Costa v Jones was not the first to have come before the courts. In an earlier case (also before Lord Mansfield) it was held, on the evidence provided by witnesses (including two doctors) to a jury that Monsieur D'Eon was female. It was not until this case that the Court (Lord Mansfield) considered the public policy issues arising from this form of wager.

== Judgment ==
Lord Mansfield held the contract was ineffective, on the basis that it was not in good faith.

== See also ==
- Good faith
