= Alderson v Temple =

- Court: Court of King's Bench
- Citation: (1768) 96 ER 384

Keywords
- Insolvency, voidable transaction

Alderson v Temple (1746-1779) 1 Black W 660, 96 ER 384 is a UK insolvency law case, concerning voidable transactions under what was the Fraudulent Conveyances Act 1571, and what is now the Insolvency Act 1986 section 423.

== Facts ==
On Saturday morning Alderson (recorded as A.B. in the report) committed acts of bankruptcy. On Friday morning, Alderson had posted a £600 note from London to Temple, one of his creditors in Trowbridge, in return for two £300 notes. Temple's two notes arrived on Monday. The assignees of Alderson brought an action for the value of the note. They argued, first, that the transfer of the note did not take effect merely by putting it in the post, and second, that it was an unlawful preference under the Fraudulent Conveyances Act 1571.

== Judgment ==
Lord Mansfield CJ held the Fraudulent Conveyances Act 1571 applied, not just to fraudulent conveyances, but also the granting of fraudulent preferences, and Alderson's actions were void.

Commercial transactions should be determined on solid principles, not upon nice subtilties of law. I shall therefore avoid going into the question, whether a contract is complete with or without delivery of possession. The true rule in that case is, to regard the solid justice of the transaction from its own circumstances. If a man has bills of exchange sent by the post, or goods consigned on shipboard, or sent by a common carrier, and has paid a valuable consideration for them, the contract is undoubtedly complete. But if the consideration is not paid, the property is not held to be vested by such delivery.

[...]

All acts to defraud creditors or to defraud the public law of the land, as the Statutes of Bankruptcy are, are absolutely void. It has been determined, that a conveyance of all a man’s property in trade to pay a bona fide creditor of the most meritorious nature, though not amounting to half the debt, is fraudulent. Why? Because it is not an act in the ordinary course of business, and must inevitably produce an act of bankruptcy, and it defeats the equality intended by the law... If the conveyance be to distribute all his effects just as the Statutes of Bankruptcy direct, it is fraudulent and void; because a man shall not choose his own assignees, and thereby defraud the law, which vests the power over bankrupts in the Great Seal. A general question has been started, whether a man may or may not, at the eve of a bankruptcy, give a preference to a particular creditor? I think he may, and he may not. If one demands it first, or sues him, or threatens him, without fraud, the preference is good. But where it is manifestly to defeat the law, it is bad. In the present case there is no course of dealing of this kind; no demand; no threat; but it is done with a positive view of iniquity.

Yates J, Aston J and Willes J concurred.

== See also ==
- UK insolvency law
