= Pillans v Van Mierop =

Pillans v Van Mierop & Hopkins
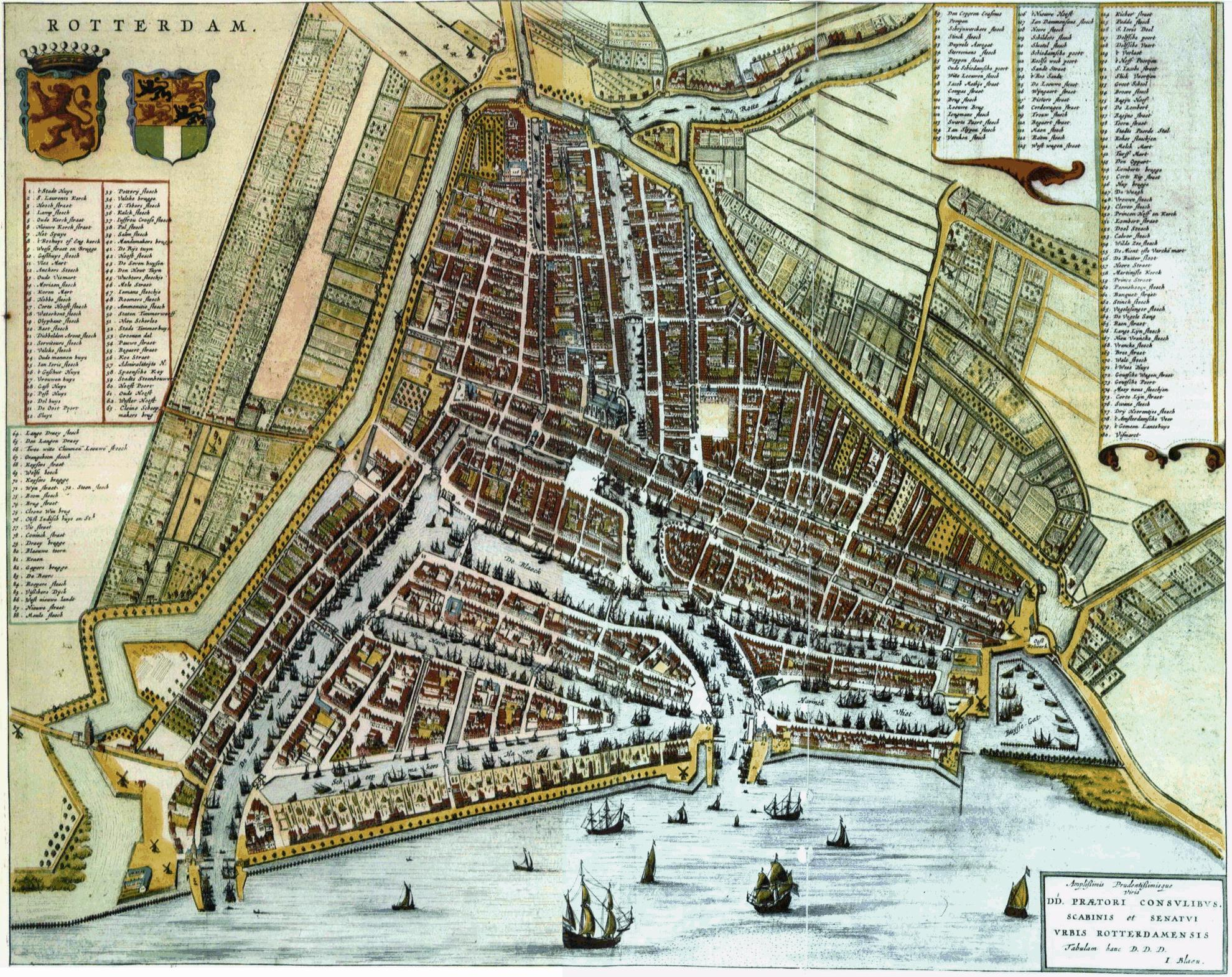
- Court: King's Bench
- Full case name: Pillans & Rose v Van Mierop & Hopkins
- Citation: (1765) 3 Burr 1663, 97 ER 1035

Case opinions
- Lord Mansfield, Wilmot J, Yates J and Aston J

Pillans & Rose v Van Mierop & Hopkins (1765) 3 Burr 1663 is a case concerning letters of credit, and the doctrine of consideration. It has been recommended as a landmark case in English contract law. Lord Mansfield tentatively expressed a view that the doctrine of consideration was redundant. However, in Rann v Hughes the House of Lords doubted the presumption.

== Facts ==
Pillans & Rose were in business together as merchant bankers in Rotterdam. They agreed to accept bills from White, an Irish merchant, on one condition. White had to make sure Van Mierop & Hopkins, a big London firm, would guarantee the bills. Van Mierop confirmed that they would do so and would guarantee a pre-existing duty of White to pay Pillans. However, before the bills were drawn on Van Mierop, White went insolvent. Van Mierop refused to honour the bills and argued that Pillans had not provided consideration for their guarantee since there was a standing rule that contracts were only valid if they contained something in return (quid pro quo) Otherwise promising to pay a bill without a return would be a nudum pactum (empty promise).

== Judgment ==
Lord Mansfield held that the doctrine of consideration should not be applied to preclude enforcement of promises made in mercantile transactions.

This is a matter of great consequence to trade and commerce, in every light...

I take it, that the ancient notion about the want of consideration was for the sake of evidence only: for when it is reduced to writing, as in covenants, specialities, bonds, etc, there was no objection to the want of consideration. And the Statute of Frauds proceeded on the same principle. In commercial cases amongst merchants, the want of consideration is not an objection...

If a man agrees that he will do the formal part, the law looks upon it (in the case of acceptance of a bill) as if actually done. This is an engagement "to accept the bill, if there was a necessity to accept it; and to pay it, when due:" and they could not afterwards retract. It would be very destructive to trade, and to trust in commercial dealing if they could.

Wilmot J said,

whether this be an actual acceptance, or an agreement to accept, it ought equally to bind. An agreement to accept a bill "to be drawn in the future" would (as it seems to me) by connection and relation, bind on account of the antecedent relation. And I see no difference between itself being before or after the bill was drawn.

== See also ==
- Swift v. Tyson
