= Portrait of William Murray =

Painting by Jean Baptiste van Loo

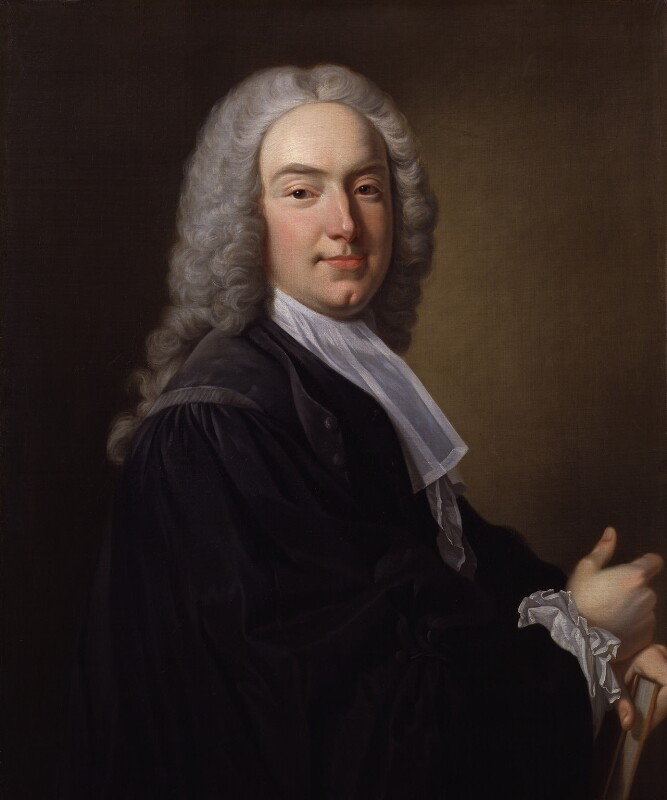
- Artist: Jean-Baptiste van Loo
- Year: c.1737
- Type: Oil on canvas, portrait painting
- Dimensions: 74.9 cm × 62.2 cm (29.5 in × 24.5 in)
- Location: National Portrait Gallery; London

Portrait of William Murray is a c.1737 portrait painting by the French artist Jean-Baptiste van Loo. It depicts the Scottish lawyer and politician William Murray as a young man. He was later made Earl of Mansfield and held a number of judicial posts including Lord Chief Justice. His rulings in Somersett's Case and the Zong massacre were notable steps in the Abolitionist movement.

Van Loo was from a noted family of painters of Dutch origin. He travelled to Britain in the 1730s and produced a number of portraits of notable figures including the Prince of Wales and Sir Robert Walpole. Today painting is in the National Portrait Gallery in London, having been presented by the Society of Judges and Serjeants-at-Law in 1877. Other versions of the portrait are at Kenwood House in Highgate and Scone Palace, both former residences of Mansfield.

== See also ==
- Portrait of Lord Mansfield, a 1783 painting by John Singleton Copley

== Bibliography ==
- Bryant, Julius. Kenwood, Paintings in the Iveagh Bequest. Yale University Press, 2003.
- Ingamells, John. National Portrait Gallery Mid-Georgian Portraits, 1760-1790. National Portrait Gallery, 2004.
- Morgan, Kenneth. Slavery and the British Empire: From Africa to America. Oxford University Press, 2007.
