= Constructive fraud =

Legal situation

Constructive fraud is a legal fiction describing a situation where a person or entity gained an unfair advantage over another by deceitful or unfair methods. Intent does not need to be shown as in the case of actual fraud. Some unfair methods may include not telling customers about defects in a product.

The elements are:

- a duty owing by the party to be charged to the complaining party due to their relationship;
- violation of that duty by the making of deceptive material misrepresentations of past or existing facts or remaining silent when a duty to speak exists;
- reliance thereon by the complaining party;
- injury to the complaining party as a proximate result thereof; and
- the gaining of an advantage by the party to be charged at the expense of the complaining party.
