= Uberrima fides =

Legal doctrine of insurance contracts

Uberrima fides (sometimes seen in its genitive form uberrimae fidei) is a Latin phrase meaning "utmost good faith" (literally, "most abundant faith"). It is the name of a legal doctrine which governs insurance contracts. This means that all parties to an insurance contract must deal in good faith, making a full declaration of all material facts in the insurance proposal. This contrasts with the legal doctrine caveat emptor ("let the buyer beware").

== Principle of uberrima fides ==
A higher duty is expected from parties to an insurance contract than from parties to most other contracts, in order to ensure the disclosure of all material facts so that the contract may accurately reflect the actual risk being undertaken. The principles underlying this rule were stated by Lord Mansfield in the leading and often-quoted case of Carter v Boehm (1766) 97 ER 1162, 1164,

Insurance is a contract of speculation... The special facts, upon which the contingent chance is to be computed, lie most commonly in the knowledge of the insured only: the under-writer trusts to his representation, and proceeds upon confidence that he does not keep back any circumstances in his knowledge, to mislead the under-writer into a belief that the circumstance does not exist... Good faith forbids either party by concealing what he privately knows, to draw the other into a bargain from his ignorance of that fact, and his believing the contrary.

Therefore, the insured must reveal the exact nature and potential of the risks that he transfers to the insurer (which may, in turn, be sold onto a reinsurer), while at the same time the insurer must make sure that the potential contract fits the needs of, and benefits, the insured.

Reinsurance contracts (between reinsurers and insurers/cedents) require the highest level of utmost good faith, and such utmost good faith is considered the foundation of reinsurance, which is an essential component of the modern insurance marketplace. In order to make reinsurance affordable, a reinsurer cannot duplicate costly insurer underwriting and claim handling costs, and must rely on an insurer's absolute transparency and candor. In return, a reinsurer must appropriately investigate and reimburse an insurer's good faith claim payments, following the fortunes of the cedent.

== Fiduciary duties ==
The fact that a contract is one of utmost good faith does not mean, however, that it gives rise to a general fiduciary relationship. The relationship between insured and insurer is not akin to the relationship between, say, guardian and ward, principal and agent, or trustee and beneficiary. In these latter instances, the inherent character of the relationship is such that the law has traditionally imported general fiduciary obligations. The insurer-insured relationship is contractual; the parties are parties to an arm's-length agreement. The principle of uberrima fides does not affect the arm's-length nature of the agreement, and cannot be used to find a general fiduciary relationship. The insurance contract, as noted above, imposes certain specific obligations on its parties. These obligations, however, do not import general fiduciary duties into each and every insurance relationship. Before such fiduciary obligations can be imported there must be specific circumstances in the relationship that call for their imposition.

In Murray v. Beard, 7 N.E. 553, 554-55 (N.Y. 1886), applying the doctrine of faithless servant, the New York Court of Appeals held that a broker could not recover commissions from his employer, holding that "An agent is held to uberrima fides in his dealings with his principal; and if he acts adversely to his employer in any part of the transaction ... it amounts to such a fraud upon the principal, as to forfeit any right to compensation for services."

== Limitations ==
Uberrima fides is strictly limited in English law to the formation of the insurance contract. During the mid-20th century, American courts expanded it much farther into a post-formation implied covenant of good faith and fair dealing. Violation of that implied covenant came to be seen as a tort, now known as insurance bad faith.

== See also ==
- Adverse selection
- Information asymmetry
- List of Latin phrases
- Meinhard v. Salmon
