= William Murray, 1st Earl of Mansfield =

British barrister, politician and judge (1705–1793)

The Right Honourable The Earl of Mansfield PC
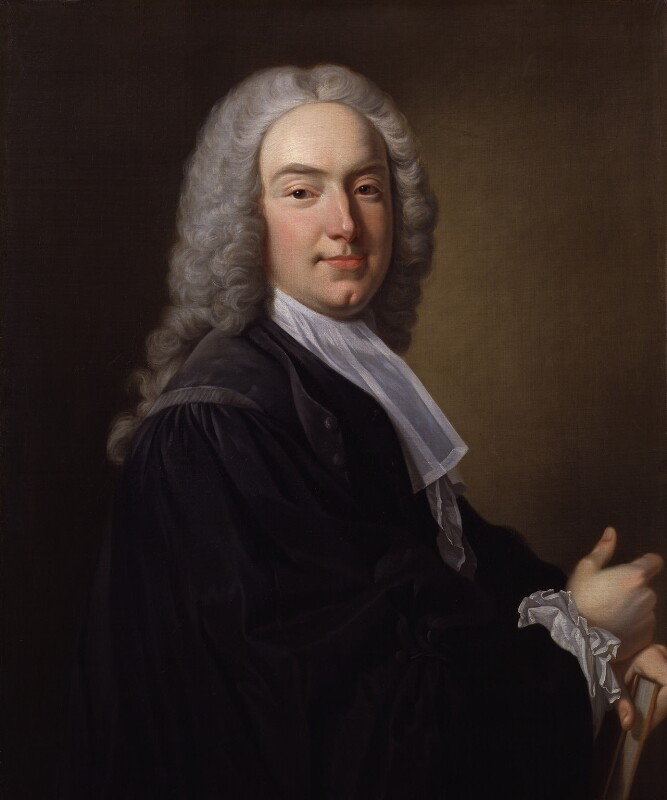
- Portrait of William Murray by Jean-Baptiste van Loo, 1737

Lord Chief Justice of the King's Bench
- In office 8 November 1756 – 4 June 1788
- Prime Minister: The Duke of Newcastle
- Preceded by: Sir Dudley Ryder
- Succeeded by: Lord Kenyon

Lord Speaker
- In office February 1783 – 23 December 1783
- Prime Minister: The Duke of Portland
- Preceded by: The Lord Thurlow as Lord Chancellor
- Succeeded by: The Lord Thurlow as Lord Chancellor

Chancellor of the Exchequer
- In office 5 April 1757 – 8 April 1757
- Prime Minister: The Duke of Newcastle
- Preceded by: Henry Bilson Legge
- Succeeded by: Henry Bilson Legge

Attorney General for England and Wales
- In office 6 March 1754 – 8 November 1756
- Prime Minister: The Duke of Newcastle
- Preceded by: Sir Dudley Ryder
- Succeeded by: Sir Robert Henley

Solicitor General for England and Wales
- In office 15 December 1742 – 6 March 1754
- Prime Minister: The Earl of Wilmington
- Preceded by: Sir John Strange
- Succeeded by: Sir Richard Lloyd

Personal details
- Born: 2 March 1705 Scone Palace, Perthshire, Scotland
- Died: 20 March 1793 (aged 88) Kenwood House, London, England
- Resting place: Westminster Abbey, London
- Spouse: Elizabeth Finch (m. 1738)
- Parent(s): David Murray, 5th Viscount of Stormont; Margaret Murray
- Education: Christ Church, Oxford

William Murray, 1st Earl of Mansfield, PC (2 March 1705 – 20 March 1793), was a British barrister, politician and judge best known for his reforms to English law. Born in Scone Palace, Perthshire into the Scottish nobility, he was educated in Perth before moving to London at the age of 13 to study at Westminster School. Accepted into Christ Church, Oxford, in May 1723, Mansfield graduated four years later and returned to London, where he was called to the Bar by Lincoln's Inn in November 1730 and quickly gained a reputation as an excellent barrister.

He became involved in British politics in 1742, beginning with his election to the House of Commons as a Member of Parliament for Boroughbridge and appointment as Solicitor General. In the absence of a strong Attorney General, Mansfield became the main spokesman for the government in the House of Commons, where he was noted for his "great powers of eloquence" and was described as "beyond comparison the best speaker". With the promotion of Sir Dudley Ryder to Lord Chief Justice in 1754, Mansfield became Attorney General and, when Ryder unexpectedly died several months later, he took his place as Chief Justice.

As the most powerful British jurist of the 18th century, Mansfield's decisions reflected the Age of Enlightenment and moved the country onto the path to abolishing slavery. He advanced commercial law in ways that helped establish Britain as world leader in industry, finance, and trade; modernised both English law and England's courts; rationalised the system for submitting motions, and reformed the way judgments were delivered to reduce expense for the parties. For his work in Carter v Boehm and Pillans v Van Mierop, Mansfield has been called the founder of English commercial law.

Mansfield is also known for his judgment in Somerset v Stewart where he held that slavery had no basis in common law and had never been established by positive law in England, and therefore was not binding in law. Though the judgement did not explicitly outlaw slavery in either England or British colonies, it played an important role in the early stages of the British abolitionist movement and inspired challenges to slavery on both sides of the Atlantic.

== Early life and education ==
Murray was born on 2 March 1705, at Scone Palace in Perthshire, Scotland, the fourth son of David Murray, 5th Viscount of Stormont and his wife Margaret as one of eleven children. Both his parents were strong supporters of the Jacobite cause, and his older brother James followed the "Old Pretender" into exile; this left the family's finance relatively impoverished. The Jacobite sympathies of Murray's family were glossed over by contemporaries, who claimed that he had been educated at Lichfield Grammar School with many other members of the English judiciary. This was incorrect, as Murray was educated at Perth Grammar School, where he was taught Latin, English grammar, and essay writing skills. He later said that this gave him a great advantage at university, as those students educated in England had been taught Greek and Latin but not how to write properly in English. While at Perth Grammar School, it became apparent that Murray was particularly intelligent. In 1718, his father and older brother, James, decided to send him to Westminster School as James knew the Dean, Francis Atterbury. Thirteen-year-old Murray travelled alone with a pony given by his father, The distance from Perth to London was around 400 miles (640 km), and the journey took Murray 54 days. Murray flourished at Westminster and was made a King's Scholar on 21 May 1719.

After an examination in May 1723, Murray was accepted into Christ Church, Oxford, having scored higher in the examination than any other King's Scholar that year. He was admitted as a commoner on 15 June 1723, and matriculated on 18 June. The records say that he came from Bath rather than Perth, as the person recording the names of the new students was unable to understand his Scottish accent. His older brother, James, was an advocate in Scotland (the Scottish equivalent of a barrister in England), and his family decided that a career as a barrister was best for Murray. The Scottish Bar at the time was overcrowded, which made it difficult for a young barrister to build a reputation, yet qualifying for the English Bar was extremely expensive. Thanks to the patronage of Thomas Foley, 1st Baron Foley, who gave Murray £200 a year to live on, Murray could afford to study at the bar, and he became a member of Lincoln's Inn on 23 April 1724.

After George I died on 11 June 1727, Murray entered and won a competition to write a Latin poem titled "The Death of the King". His actions were seen as a show of support for the House of Hanover and the political status quo, something odd considering the strong Jacobite sympathies of his family. He probably did this because, having no private income, he wished to secure patronage to help him advance politically. Another entrant was William Pitt, who was a constant rival to Murray until Pitt's death in 1778. There is very little information about Murray's time at Oxford. It is known that he studied ancient and modern history, became fluent in French, and gained a good understanding of Roman Law. He also became fluent in Latin, translating Cicero's works into English and then back into Latin. He gained his Bachelor of Arts degree in 1727, and travelled to London to train as a barrister.

== Family life ==
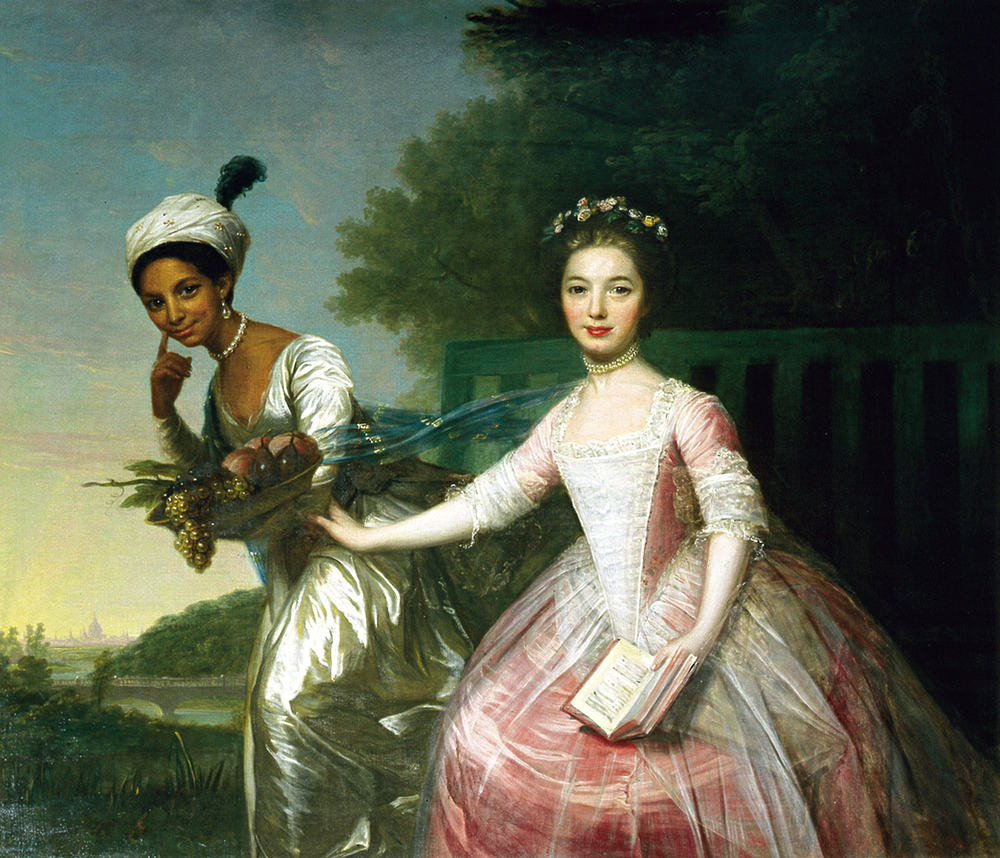
Dido Elizabeth Belle and Lady Elizabeth Murray by David Martin, 1778. Dido Belle (left) and Lady Elizabeth Murray (right)

Murray married Lady Elizabeth Finch in 1738, youngest daughter of Daniel Finch, 2nd Earl of Nottingham, 7th Earl of Winchilsea and Anne Hatton. She had thirteen siblings and her dowry was £5000.

They had no children of their own, but took care of their great niece, Lady Elizabeth Murray (born 1760), the daughter of Mansfield's nephew and heir, David Murray, 7th Viscount Stormont, after her mother died. When Mansfield's other nephew, Sir John Lindsay, returned to Britain in 1765 following the Seven Years' War and his assignment in the West Indies, he brought his illegitimate daughter, Dido, whose mother, Maria Bell, was an enslaved woman of African descent. Dido was born into slavery in 1761. Dido Elizabeth Belle was baptised November 1766 in London, eight months after Lady Elizabeth's arrival. It has been hypothesised that Mansfield took Dido in to provide grieving Lady Elizabeth with a companion who would later be her personal attendant.

Mansfield also helped mentor his nephew and heir, David Murray, 7th Viscount Stormont. Later, his nieces and unmarried sisters of Lord Stormont, Lady Anne and Lady Marjory Murray, would come to live at Kenwood to care for Lord and Lady Mansfield in their old age.

== At the English bar ==
Murray's first contact when he moved to London was William Hamilton, a Scottish-born barrister who was said to be the first Scot to practise at the English Bar, and one of the few people who was qualified to act as a barrister in both England and Scotland. Hamilton had been one of Murray's sponsors when he joined Lincoln's Inn in 1724 and, when Murray came to London, Hamilton helped find him a set of barristers' chambers at No. 1 Old Square. There was no formal legal education at this time, and the only requirement for a person to be called to the Bar was for him to have eaten five dinners a term at Lincoln's Inn, and to have read the first sentence of a paper prepared for him by the steward. Thus, most of Murray's practical training came from reading the papers in Hamilton's chambers, and listening to Lord Raymond speak in court along with tutoring by Thomas Denison on how to write special pleadings. Murray also studied various texts, including the French Ordinance de la Marine (a predecessor to the Napoleonic Commercial Code), the works of Bracton and Littleton, and "crabbed and uncouth compositions" on municipal law.

Murray was called to the Bar on 23 November 1730, taking a set of chambers at 5 King's Bench Walk. He was introduced to Alexander Pope around this time, and through his friendship met members of the aristocracy, some of whom later became his clients, including Sarah Churchill, Duchess of Marlborough. Pope also taught him oratory, which helped him enormously in court. His first two cases were in the English Court of Sessions in 1733, where he was led by Charles Talbot and opposed by Philip Yorke. The support of Talbot and Yorke allowed him to gain a respectable practice in the Court of Chancery.

Murray used his first professional earnings to purchase a china and silver-plate tea set for his kind sister in-law, Lady Stormont (mother of his nephew David Murray, 7th Viscount Stormont). Lady Stormont may have provided Murray with some financial support while he was a law student, on top of sending him food packages, including his favorite Scottish marmalade, when he was a young lawyer.

The 1707 Acts of Union had merged the Kingdom of England and Kingdom of Scotland into one national entity, but they retained separate legal systems. However, the House of Lords became the highest court of appeal in both English and Scottish law and, as a result, from 1707 Scottish cases on appeal from the Court of Session were sent there. A barrister had to be familiar with both Scottish and English law to deal with these cases, and Murray found his niche acting in Scottish cases in the House of Lords as early as 1733. His work in Moncrieff v Moncrieff in 1734 established Murray as a brilliant young barrister praised for his performance by Lords Cowper and Parker. After Moncrieff, Murray was involved in almost every case in the House of Lords, whether it had been appealed from a Scottish court or not.

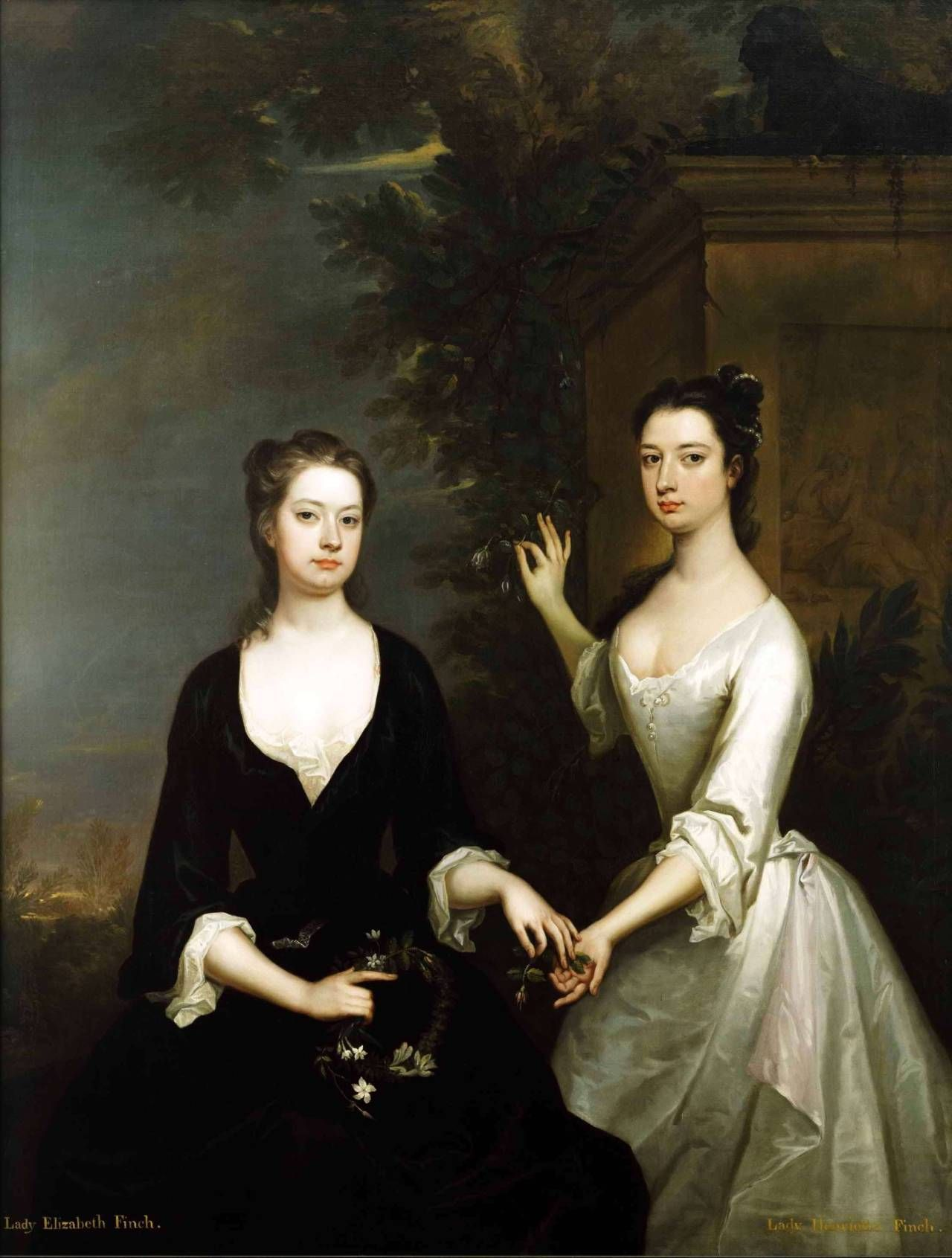
Lady Elizabeth Finch (Later Countess of Mansfield) (left) and her sister Lady Henrietta, Duchess of Cleveland (right).

In 1737, Murray acted as Counsel for the City of Edinburgh in the aftermath of the death of Captain John Porteous. In Edinburgh, it was traditional for criminals sentenced to death to be allowed to visit a church near the city jail the Sunday before the execution. Two criminals named Wilson and Robertson took this as an opportunity to escape; although Wilson did not make it out of the church, Robertson escaped completely. Wilson had been a smuggler who supplied his fellow citizens with goods and, because of this and the unpopularity of the city guard, public opinion was firmly on his side. Porteous was the captain of the Edinburgh city guard, and was angry with Wilson's attempt to escape and aware of the possibility of an attempt to free him. Porteous ordered a guard of 80 men to be placed around the gallows for Wilson's execution. When a man attempted to cut Wilson's body down after the execution, Porteous ordered his troops to fire on the crowd, and seven people were killed. Porteous was initially sentenced to death for murder and, when the execution was delayed, a mob of citizens rushed the city jail and lynched him.

As a result, a bill was proposed in the House of Commons that sought to punish the City of Edinburgh for the behaviour of its citizens by disenfranchising the city. Murray represented the City in both the House of Commons and the House of Lords, and eventually whittled down the bill so much that, by the time it was voted on, it simply proposed to fine the city and disqualify the Provost. In exchange for his work, the citizens of Edinburgh gave him the Freedom of the City and a diamond, which is still in the possession of his family. Murray's reputation continued to grow; in 1738, he was involved in 11 of the 16 cases heard in the House of Lords, and in 1739 and 1740 he acted as legal counsel in 30 cases there.

On 20 September 1738, he married Lady Elizabeth Finch, the daughter of Daniel Finch, 2nd Earl of Nottingham, 7th Earl of Winchilsea and Anne Hatton, at Raby Castle, home of her sister Duchess of Cleveland in Durham. Her other sisters included Charlotte Seymour, Duchess of Somerset, Mary Ker, Duchess of Roxburghe, and Lady Mary who was married to Thomas Watson-Wentworth, 1st Marquess of Rockingham. Some of the aristocrats thought that the bride had married way below her status, and they also accused the groom (at the time just Mr. Murray) of social climbing into one of the great English families which the Finches belonged to. Indeed, Mansfield's marriage helped him be accepted by the highest level of the aristocracy. Murray's connection with the Marquess of Rockingham especially had a significant positive influence on his future career. After a short holiday, Murray returned to his work as a barrister.

== Member of Parliament ==
Murray circa 1737; portrait by John Giles Eccardt assistant of Jean-Baptiste van Loo.

Murray had repeatedly refused to become a Member of Parliament, saying he had no interest in politics. In 1742, however, the government of Sir Robert Walpole fell, and Murray's brother-in-law, Daniel Finch, 8th Earl of Winchilsea, became First Lord of the Admiralty in the new Cabinet. With this added political influence, Murray hoped to be appointed to a government office, and when Sir John Strange resigned as Solicitor General, Murray was made a Member of Parliament for Boroughbridge on 15 December 1742 and immediately succeeded Strange as Solicitor General.

Although the Solicitor General was the lowest legal appointment, a successful one could be appointed Attorney General, and by custom, the Attorney General was allowed to become Lord Chief Justice if a vacancy arose. Although many barristers were not good politicians, Murray became a successful Member of Parliament, and one noted for his oratorical skills and logical arguments.

In 1745, Murray defended the actions of the government in hiring 16,000 Hanoverian troops to help fight in the War of the Austrian Succession. His argument (that it was the prerogative of the King to decide how a war should be fought, and he should not be second-guessed by politicians with no experience of warfare) defeated the motion to cease employing the Hanoverian troops by 231 votes to 181. Murray became popular with both the government and George II as a result, and in the absence of a strong Attorney General, Murray spoke for the government in most matters. In 1747, he helped Lord Hardwicke write and pass an act to abolish the old hereditary positions in Scotland. In 1751 he drafted the government response to an attempt by Frederick the Great of Prussia to frustrate neutral shipping, which William Scott, 1st Baron Stowell called "the foundation of the modern law of neutrality", and Montesquieu described it as a "résponse sans réplique" (response without a reply).

The death of Frederick, Prince of Wales, the heir to the British throne on 20 March 1751, caused constitutional chaos; George II wished to appoint his favourite son Prince William, Duke of Cumberland, as Regent (since the heir apparent, Prince George, was only a child), while the public favoured the child's mother Princess Augusta. In an attempt to reach a compromise the government introduced a bill to Parliament declaring that Augusta was to be a regent along with a council of others, and that George would become the heir when he reached maturity. Murray made a speech supporting the government's proposal, but despite this, Parliament was not convinced that a council was necessary.

On 6 March 1754, the Prime Minister Henry Pelham died, and this necessitated a Cabinet reshuffle. The Attorney General, Sir Dudley Ryder, became Lord Chief Justice of the King's Bench, and Murray became Attorney General in his place. A few months later the Master of the Rolls died, and Murray was asked to replace him; he declined, however, as he "did not want to leave His Majesty's service". After Ryder died unexpectedly on 25 May 1756, however, Murray could not turn down the opportunity, and immediately applied to replace him as Lord Chief Justice.

He was accepted, and although his appointment delighted Murray, the government was very concerned at the loss of a good Attorney General. In an attempt to persuade him to stay, the new Prime Minister, Thomas Pelham-Holles, 1st Duke of Newcastle-upon-Tyne offered him the post of Chancellor of the Duchy of Lancaster, in addition to the position of Attorney General, an extra £6,000 a year, and a pension, and finally attempted to blackmail him by saying that if he accepted the office of Lord Chief Justice, the government would refuse to grant him a peerage. It was customary for all Lord Chief Justices to be given a peerage, and Murray responded by saying that in that situation he would refuse to become either Lord Chief Justice or Attorney General. Newcastle gave in, and promised to allow him to become Lord Chief Justice and to recommend him for a peerage.

This was seen as an excellent result by Murray, who had no interest in politics except as a stepping stone to become a member of the judiciary. Murray was not suited to politics, as he was far too calculating and independent of thought to accept any one party's doctrine. His Scottish and Jacobite roots also allowed for endless insinuation and controversy—in 1753 he was accused by James Johnson Bishop of Gloucester of "having drunk the health of the Old Pretender on his knees". Although the story was proven to be false, it embarrassed Murray, and was used to taunt him as late as 1770. His rivalry with William Pitt highlighted his unsuitability for politics—unlike such other politicians as Philip Yorke and Edward Thurlow, he did not have the temperament to resist "the vehemence of Pitt's invective". It was widely felt that he could have become Prime Minister after the death of Henry Pelham, but it would have "set [his genius] in a false environment", and he declined all opportunities to return to politics except as Lord Chief Justice.

== Lord Chief Justice ==
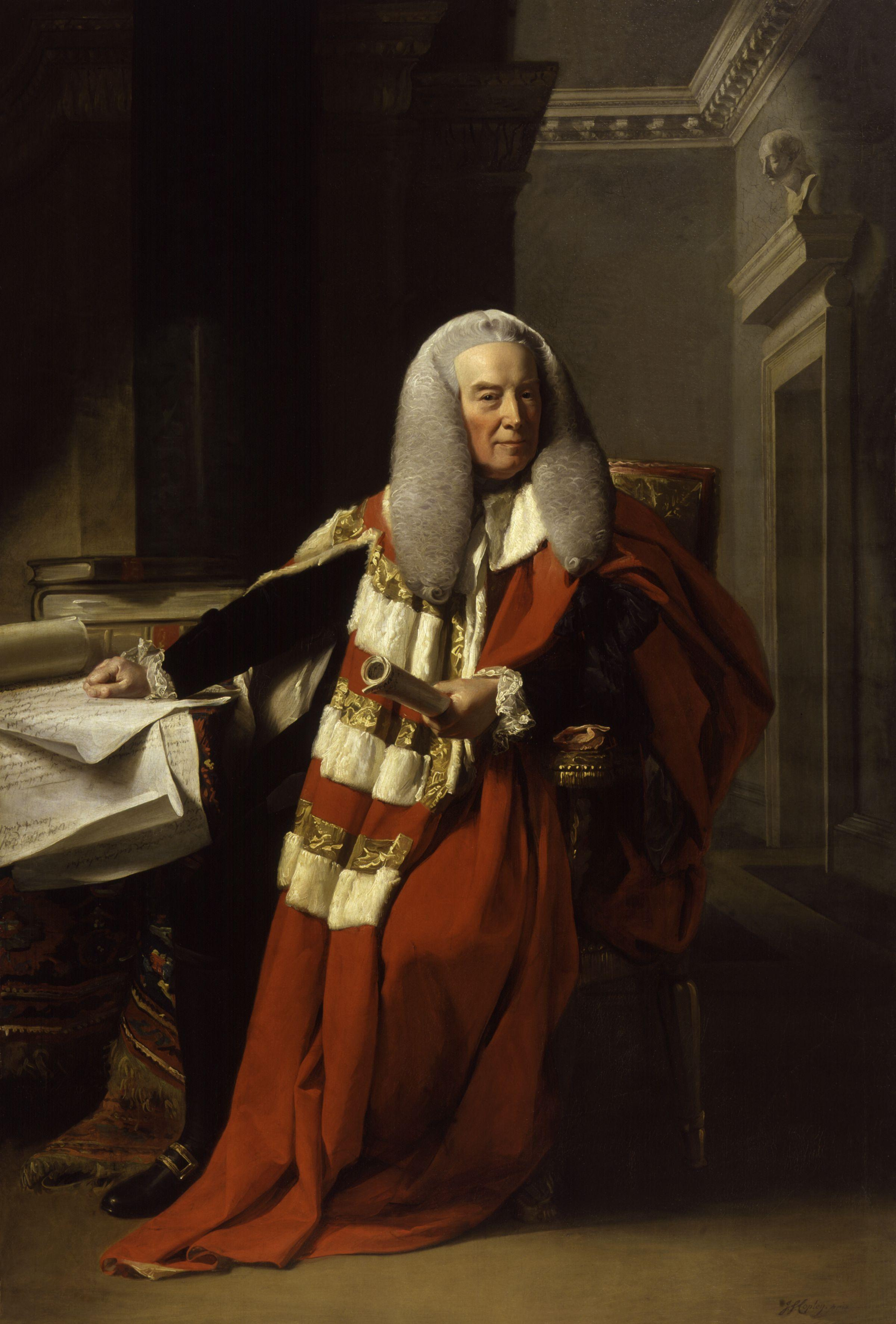
Portrait of Lord Mansfield. Murray in his parliamentary robes as an earl, by John Singleton Copley 1783

Anyone wishing to become a judge was required to be a Serjeant-at-law, which Murray was not; as such, he left Lincoln's Inn to join Serjeant's Inn. He qualified as a Serjeant-at-law on 8 November 1756, and was sworn in as Lord Chief Justice at the house of the Lord Chancellor that evening. Immediately afterwards he was created Baron Mansfield.

On 19 November, he was sworn in as a Privy Counsellor. He suspended his duties temporarily on 5 April 1757, when appointed Chancellor of the Exchequer, due to an old custom that the Lord Chief Justice took the position when it was empty. He only served until 8 April, and there is no evidence of his performing anything more than the standard day-to-day duties. He became a cabinet minister in 1757, still serving as Lord Chief Justice, and stayed until 1765.

The journal of James Boswell for 20 May 1768 records some six pages of dialogue, in direct quotation, between Boswell and Mansfield. Boswell, an attorney whose father was a judge in the supreme courts of Scotland, describes a social visit to Mansfield's home. (Mansfield knew the reputation of Boswell's father, with whom he was not personally acquainted, and held him in high regard.). The discussion largely concerned the Douglas Cause; Boswell was an active partisan of Archibald Douglas. An additional entry for two days later similarly records a discussion concerning the election corruption trial of Boswell's friend George Dempster.

=== Reform ===
Mansfield first sat in court on 11 November 1756, and at the time had "a very low estimate of the Common Law of England which he was to administer". The legal system had been put together in the period immediately after the Norman conquest of England, and was completely unsuited to the 18th century, when Britain was "the greatest manufacturing and commercial country in the world". Mansfield immediately began to reform the way the law and courts worked. One of his first acts as Lord Chief Justice was to change the system for submitting motions. Every day the court was in session, all barristers were invited to submit motions, in order of their seniority as barristers. Because they were allowed to submit as many motions as they wanted, by the time junior barristers were allowed to submit their motions, it was normally the end of the day. This meant that almost all the work went to the senior barristers, who were so overworked that they often did not have time to prepare properly before going to court. In addition it meant that work for junior barristers was scarce, hindering their careers. Mansfield changed the system so that barristers were allowed to submit only one motion a day, and if not all barristers had been heard by the end of the day, they could continue where they left off the next morning.

At the time it was also traditional for all judgments to be reserved. Although in a small number of cases this was useful, in the majority of cases it simply made coming to court more expensive and wasted time. As soon as Mansfield became Lord Chief Justice, he changed the rules so that, unless the court had doubts over the evidence presented to them, a judgment was to be made immediately. This had a far-reaching effect on the English courts. Judges from the Court of Appeal and High Court of Justice now give reserved judgments in only a minority of cases. His reforms led to the Court of King's Bench becoming one of the most active courts, at the expense of the Court of Common Pleas, which was described as the "sleepy hollow".

=== Mercantile law changes ===
In the eighteenth century, English merchant law was still based on the Lex mercatoria, a medieval series of customs and principles used to regulate trading. Other countries in Europe had reformed and modernised their law, resulting in English merchant law being about a century behind mercantile law of other European countries. A merchant was, by his very nature, international, and the inconsistencies between English law and the law of other nations made business difficult.

Mansfield made a great effort to bring English merchant law up to the same standards as that of other European nations, defining his position by saying that "the daily negotiations and property of merchants ought not to depend on subtleties and niceties, but upon rules easily learned and easily retained because they are dictates of common sense drawn from the truth of the case". In most European countries, the principle was that a merchant was bound by his promises, not just his signed legal documents, while English lawyers maintained that a merchant could only be legally bound by documents that he signed. The European principle was based on the assumption of good faith on the part of the merchants, or uberrima fides, something completely lacking in English law. In Carter v Boehm, Mansfield got a chance to reform the law relating to the assumption of good faith. Carter was the Governor of Fort Marlborough (now Bengkulu), which was built by the British East India Company in Sumatra. He took out an insurance policy with Boehm against the fort's being taken by a foreign enemy. A witness called Captain Tryon testified that Carter knew the fort was built to resist attacks from natives but not European enemies, and the French were likely to attack. The French did attack, and Boehm refused to fulfil the insurance claim.

Mansfield decided in favour of Boehm, saying that Carter had failed his duty of uberrima fides. In his judgment Mansfield said that:

Insurance is a contract based upon speculation. The special facts, upon which the contingent chance is to be computed, lie most commonly in the knowledge of the insured only; the underwriter trusts to his representation and proceeds upon the confidence that he does not keep back any circumstance in his knowledge, to mislead the underwriter into a belief that the circumstance does not exist, and to induce him to estimate the risque as if it did not exist. Good faith forbids either party by concealing what he privately knows, to draw the other into a bargain from his ignorance of that fact, and his believing the contrary.

This was an attempt by Mansfield to introduce the assumption of good faith into English law, and although it failed for the most part (as most areas of English commercial law no longer use uberrima fides), it is still used in insurance contracts. In insurance agreements, the insuree inevitably knows more about the risk involved than the insurer; without the requirement for pre-contractual "good faith", the insuree would have no reason to tell the truth, and insurance companies would be loath to make contracts.

In the earlier case of Pillans & Rose v Van Mierop & Hopkins, Mansfield had tried to challenge the doctrine of consideration. In English law, consideration is a vital part of the contract; without valid consideration, almost any contract is void. But, Mansfield argued in his judgment that it should only be treated as evidence of a contract, not as a vital element. Mansfield failed to make clear that he was referring only to consideration in commercial contracts, not general contracts, and as a result his judgment read that consideration was not required for any contract. His judgment has been much criticised by legal academics, and was effectively overruled by the House of Lords in Rann v Hughes [1778] 7 T. R. 350.

Mansfield also enforced a previous judgement of the Court of King's Bench made in 1645, in which they allowed a special jury of merchants to sit in cases involving commercial law. He built up a special corps of these jurymen, some of whom, such as Edward Vaux, became noted experts on commercial law. "Lord Mansfield's jurymen" acted as an effective liaison between the merchants and the courts. Mansfield was personally a supporter of free trade who was heavily influenced by Roman law and ancient Roman and Greek writers such as Cicero and Xenophon.

In 1783, Mansfield heard the case of Gregson v. Gilbert (1783) 3 Doug 232, 99 ER 629, regarding the payment of an insurance claim for slaves killed when thrown overboard by the captain of a slave-ship – an event now known as the Zong massacre. Mansfield, in summing up the jury's verdict, said "The Case of Slaves was the same as if Horses had been thrown over board", and endeavoured to uphold the notion that slaves were property which could be destroyed in situations of "absolute necessity". But, new information was introduced in the case, and he ruled against the owners of the ship. In doing this, he achieved his aim of preventing maritime insurance law from becoming more complicated.

=== Copyright law ===
Mansfield made another notable judgment in Millar v Taylor (1769) 4 Burr 2303, 98 ER 201 (20 April 1769), in relation to copyright law. Andrew Millar was a bookseller who in 1729 had purchased the publishing rights to James Thomson's poem "The Seasons". After the term of the exclusive rights granted under the Statute of Anne expired, Robert Taylor began publishing his own competing publication, which contained Thomson's poem. Mansfield, sitting with three other judges, concluded that despite the Statute of Anne there was a perpetual common law copyright, and therefore that no works can ever be considered public domain. This was a massive victory for booksellers and publishers, as it meant that they could effectively make it impossible for new companies to compete, as in the absence of new texts, there was nothing they could print. Mansfield's judgment was finally overruled by the House of Lords in Donaldson v Beckett in 1774.

Mansfield's judgment has been criticised as being unusually short-sighted because he failed to see that while his decision was correct for that particular case, the precedent it would set would create an unfair monopoly for the booksellers and publishers. This was one of only a small number of cases in which Mansfield was overruled; in his entire career only six of his judgments were overturned by a higher court. Mansfield's judgement here has been seen as part of a wider agenda; along with other legal figures such as Sir William Blackstone, he was personally in favour of a perpetual copyright.

=== Junius ===
In 1695 Parliament failed to renew the Licensing Acts, and as a result, the press were free to print material attacking the government. Although there were eight attempts to force a new Licensing Act through Parliament between 1697 and 1713, none of them succeeded. Despite the freedom of the press from pre-censorship by the government, the judiciary regularly tried people for seditious libel if they printed material attacking the government. From 21 November 1768, letters written by a man under the pseudonym of Junius were published in the Public Advertiser, a London newspaper run by Henry Sampson Woodfall. In them, Junius attacked many political leaders, including John Manners, Marquess of Granby and Mansfield. As his letters were wildly popular, the circulation of the Public Advertiser doubled in just five months.

On 19 December 1769, Junius wrote a letter attacking the King, and incensed at this, the government ordered several people to be arrested and tried for seditious libel, including Woodfall for publishing the letters, John Almon for selling them, and John Miller for republishing them. Almon's case was heard at Westminster Hall by Mansfield and a jury on 2 June 1770. He was found guilty, although it is unclear in what fashion he was punished, if at all. Woodfall was tried on 13 June 1770, by Mansfield and a jury. While Mansfield believed that the language used was libellous, the jury disagreed, and held that he was "guilty of printing and publishing only", and innocent of seditious libel. Miller was tried on 13 July 1770, and after six hours of discussion, the jury found him innocent. As a result of these two trials, it became clear that no jury would convict a printer for printing these letters, leaving Junius free to continue publishing them.

On 14 November 1770, a letter by Junius directed at Mansfield was published by the Public Advertiser and the London Evening Post, a newspaper run by John Miller. In it, Junius attacked Mansfield, first for being Scottish, then for being a lapsed Jacobite, and finally for attempting to suppress the freedom of the press. In a response to Junius' letter dated 16 November 1770, Mansfield made the following threat:

Sir, if in future you indulge the ill-founded asperity of your Pen, [you] may be called to answer for your Conduct, in a way that may cause you to regret that ever you was born, or, at least, that Nature has given you Abilities, which, if guided by Discretion, would have made you as much a Blessing, as you are now a Curse to Mankind.

Although the Attorney General, William de Grey, advised that the publishers should again be prosecuted, Mansfield disagreed, saying that if they failed to respond to Junius, he would become bored and stop writing. Mansfield was evidently correct, because other than a letter printed on 5 October 1771, Junius ceased to write at the beginning of 1772.

=== Somersett's Case ===
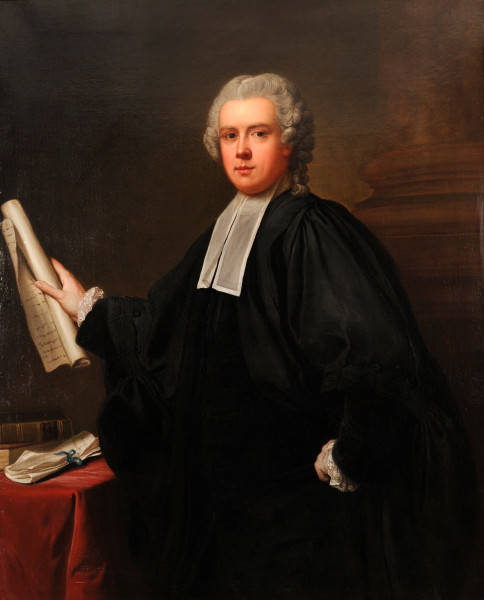
Francis Hargrave, who represented James Somersett in this case

Mansfield is best known for his judgment in Somersett's Case on the legality of keeping slaves in England. The English had been involved in the slave trade since 1553, and by 1768, ships registered in Liverpool, Bristol and London carried more than half the slaves shipped in the world. James Somersett was a slave owned by Charles Stewart, an American customs officer who sailed to Britain for business, landing on 10 November 1769. A few days later Somersett attempted to escape. He was recaptured in November and imprisoned on the ship Ann and Mary, owned by Captain John Knowles and bound for the British colony of Jamaica. Stewart intended to sell him there. However, three people claiming to be Somersett's godparents, John Marlow, Thomas Walkin and Elizabeth Cade, made an application before the Court of King's Bench for a writ of habeas corpus, and Captain Knowles was ordered to produce Somersett before the Court of King's Bench, which would determine whether his imprisonment was legal.

Mansfield ordered a hearing for 22 January 1772. Following an adjournment, the case was not heard until 7 February 1772. In the meantime, the case had attracted a great deal of attention in the press, and members of the public were forthcoming with donations to fund lawyers for both sides of the argument. An activist layman, Granville Sharp, who continually sought test cases against the legal justifications for slavery, was Somersett's real backer. When the case was heard, no fewer than five advocates appeared for the slave, speaking at three separate hearings between February and May. These lawyers included William Davy SL, John Glynn SL, James Mansfield and Francis Hargrave, who was later to become a noted barrister based on his work in this case. Charles Stewart was represented by John Dunning and James Wallace.

On behalf of Somersett, it was argued that while colonial laws might permit slavery, neither the common law of England, nor any law made by Parliament recognised the existence of slavery, and slavery was therefore illegal. Moreover, English contract law did not allow for any person to enslave himself, nor could any contract be binding without the person's consent. The arguments thus focused on legal details rather than humanitarian principles. A law passed in 1765 said that all lands, forts and slaves owned by the Africa Company were a property of the Crown, which could be interpreted to mean that the Crown accepted slavery. When the two lawyers for Charles Stewart put their case, they argued that a contract for the sale of a slave was recognised in England, and therefore the existence of slaves must be legally valid.

After the attorneys for both sides had given their arguments, Mansfield called a recess, saying that "[the case] required ... [a] consultation ... among the twelve Judges". Finally, on 22 June 1772 Mansfield gave his judgment, which ruled that a master could not carry his slave out of England by force, and concluded:

The state of slavery is of such a nature, that it is incapable of being introduced on any reasons, moral or political; but only positive law, which preserves its force long after the reasons, occasion, and time itself from whence it was created, is erased from memory: it's so odious, that nothing can be suffered to support it, but positive law. Whatever inconveniences, therefore, may follow from a decision, I cannot say this case is allowed or approved by the law of England; and therefore the black must be discharged.

This was not an end to slavery, as this only confirmed it was illegal to transport a slave out of England and Wales against his or her will. Slavery also persisted in the rest of the British Empire. As a result of the reporting of Mansfield's decision, public opinion and some newspapers gave the impression that slavery had been abolished by the ruling. Some historians believe that between 14,000 and 15,000 slaves were immediately freed in England, some of whom remained with their masters as paid or unpaid employees. However, it is questionable whether that many black people lived in England at the time, and most of them were already free men and women, or were runaway slaves who had evaded the authorities. The decision was vague enough to allow Africans to still be hunted and kidnapped in London, Liverpool and Bristol to be sold elsewhere. (Such an incident was recounted by Olaudah Equiano in 1774 in his autobiography, An Interesting Narrative (1789).)

Mansfield believed that his decision meant that slavery continued, because his mixed-race great-niece Dido Elizabeth Belle remained a slave in his household, until his 1793 will allowed her to be considered a free woman. (She had been born into slavery as the illegitimate daughter of his nephew in the West Indies but lived with him and his wife for 30 years.) In addition, advertisements from the 1770s show that slaves continued to be bought and sold in England. Mansfield referred to slaves in his judgment in a later case. Although slavery was not completely abolished in the British Empire until 1834, Mansfield's decision is considered to have been a significant step in recognising the illegality of slavery.

== Lord Mansfield's Rule ==
Lord Mansfield is frequently mentioned in modern legal settings as the originator of "Lord Mansfield's Rule", in his own words: "the law of England is clear, that the declarations of a father or mother, cannot be admitted to bastardize the issue born after marriage." This quote comes from Mansfield's appellate decision in Goodright v Moss. The primary legal question in the case was not this preexisting principle, which applies only to children "born after marriage", but rather whether the child had been born before the marriage. The question was whether statements the child's parents allegedly made before their deaths could be introduced as evidence that the child had been born before their marriage and was thus illegitimate. Mansfield ruled to admit the testimony against the child's legitimacy and grant a new trial. The term "Lord Mansfield's Rule" is often used in a slightly different sense to denote the principle still applied in several jurisdictions that marriage creates a conclusive presumption of a husband's paternity of his wife's child.

== House of Lords ==
After the formation of the Fox-North Coalition, Mansfield agreed to act as Speaker of the House of Lords, taking up his post in February 1783. The main item of debate during the Coalition Ministry was the East India Bill, which provoked bitter arguments in both the House of Lords and House of Commons. In an attempt to speed up the process of passing the bill, Mansfield left his position as speaker to debate directly on 15 December; when this failed to help he returned to the Woolsack the next day. The failure of the bill caused the government to be immediately dismissed, and Mansfield left his position on 23 December 1783.

Mansfield had been made earl of Mansfield, in the County of Nottingham, on 31 October 1776. He attended the Lords as Lord Speaker, and the last record of him attending (other than his presence at the state opening of Parliament on 23 March 1784) was in December 1783.

== Retirement and death ==
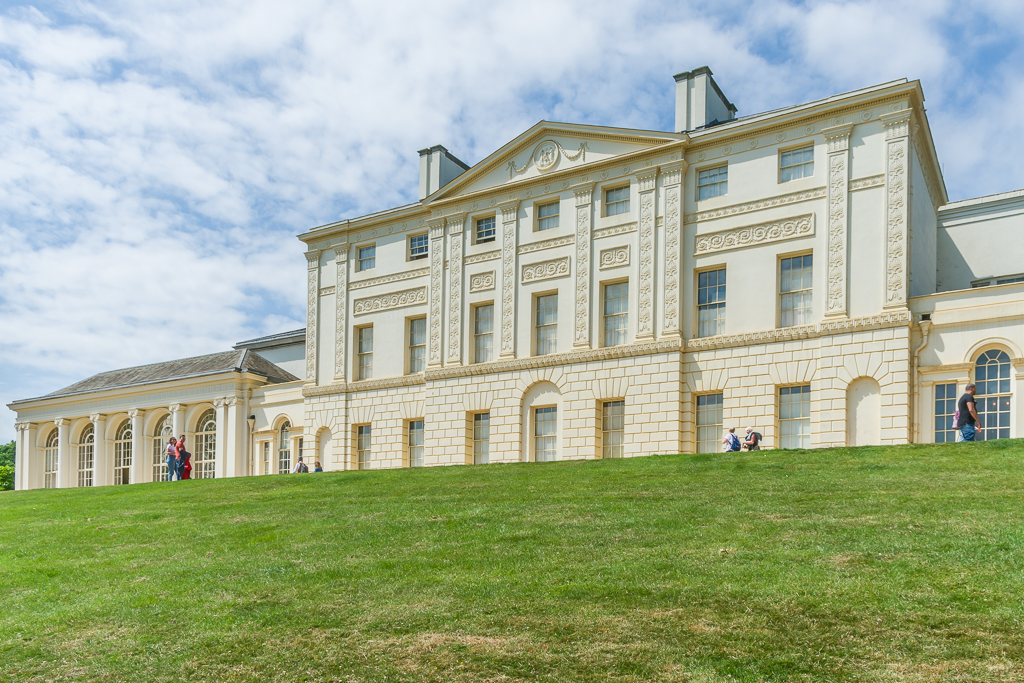
Kenwood House, Hampstead, London

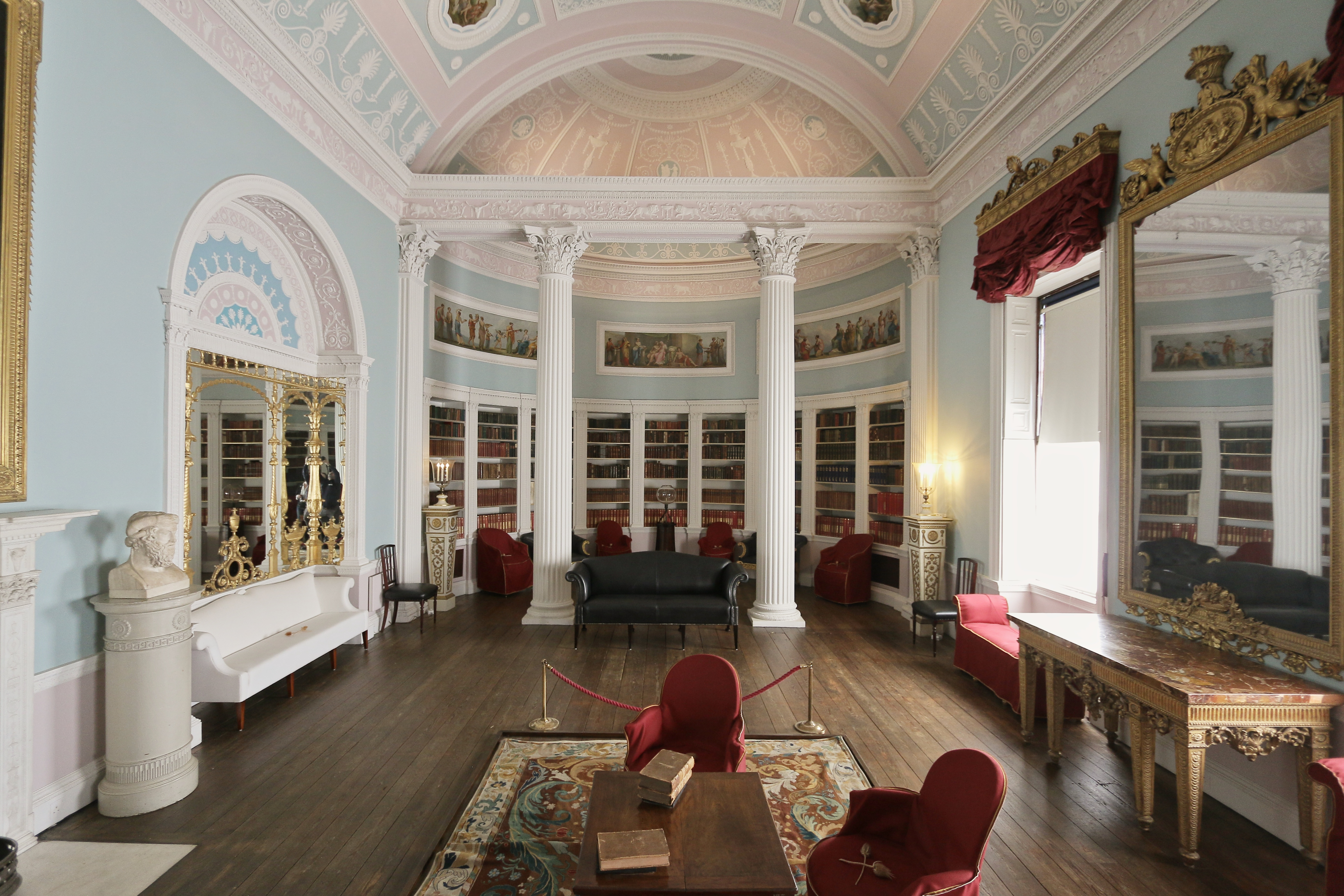
Kenwood Library, considered to be one of the best Robert Adams-designed room

Despite failing health, Mansfield refused to officially leave his post as Lord Chief Justice because George III was opposed to the appointment of Mansfield's protégé Francis Buller to the position after Mansfield resigned. The government of the time instead suggested Lloyd Kenyon as a possible successor. Mansfield clung to office until 1788 (despite not sitting in court for two years), in the hope that the government would fall before he was forced to retire. This was not to be, and on 3 June, he wrote a letter of resignation effective the next day.

Mansfield spent the remainder of his life at Kenwood House looked after by his nieces Lady Anne and Lady Marjory Murray and Dido Belle. Most of his time was spent maintaining the grounds. When Fanny Burney visited Kenwood in June 1792, she was unable to see Lord Mansfield, because he was too infirm and had not been downstairs for four years, she asked after Miss Murrays and left her respects but "Miss Murrays were upstairs with Lord Mansfield, whom they never left".

In the summer, he was visited by groups of barristers who informed him of the goings-on at court. On 1 August 1792 he was made earl of Mansfield, in the County of Middlesex. On 10 March 1793, he complained of feeling sleepy, and although he recovered the next day, by 12 March, he was again complaining of a need for sleep. He went to bed early and remained asleep until 18 March, when he finally died. His body was buried in the north transept of Westminster Abbey. His monument at Westminster was commissioned by his nephew David Murray, 2nd Earl of Mansfield. It was sculpted by John Flaxman (by suggestion of Sir William Hamilton).

Mansfield left a large amount of money after his death, including an estate worth £500,000 to his nephew, now the 2nd Earl. He also gave £2,000 to Francis Buller.

== Legacy ==
English law saw significant changes during Mansfield's career. As lord chief justice, Mansfield had done much to reform the way the courts worked, making it easier for people to gain access to legal aid, and also making the process much less expensive. He was also noted for his insistence that equity should be applied by all courts, not just the Court of Chancery, a view that provoked much disagreement during his lifetime, but was eventually confirmed by Parliament in the Supreme Court of Judicature Act 1873, which allowed all courts to take cases of equity. He also established the principle that rather than blindly following precedent, judges should seek to find loopholes in rules that were no longer applicable, something that later received the support of Oliver Wendell Holmes Jr., who said, "It is revolting to have no better reason for a rule of law than that so it was laid down in the time of Henry IV. It is more revolting still if the grounds upon which it was laid down have vanished long since, and the rule simply persists from blind imitation of the past." He made his judgements on the principle that "as the usages of society alter, the law must adapt itself to the various situations of mankind", leading John Baker to describe him as "one of the boldest of judicial spirits".

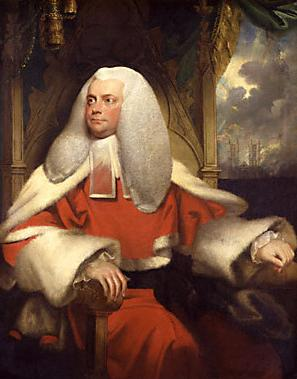
Sir Francis Buller, whom Mansfield tried to make Lord Chief Justice after his retirement

His most important contributions were to commercial, merchant and common law. Mansfield spent much time bringing the law of England on par with that of other countries, particularly in cases such as Pillans & Rose v Van Mierop & Hopkins [1765] 3 Burr 1663, and Carter v Boehm [1766] 3 Burr 1905. As a result of his work, he was described by a later judge as "the founder of the commercial law of this country".

He was, however, criticised for his resistance to the freedom of the press and his refusal to go against the King, as well as for blatant nepotism—highlighted by his attempts to have Francis Buller made Lord Chief Justice after his retirement. He was also criticised as a politician for his support of a government antagonistic to the colonies; in 1829 John Quincy Adams described him as "more responsible for the Revolution than any other man". Scholars such as John Chipman Gray have questioned his reputation as a universally successful judge, saying that "the reputation of Lord Mansfield as a commercial lawyer should not blind us to the fact that he was not equally great in the law of real property".

Opinion over Mansfield's intention in his ruling in Somerset's Case is mixed, with the current prevailing view being that he did not intend to free the slaves. The judgment was particularly narrow, as it ruled only that a master could not carry his slave out of England by force, not that slaves who came to England were emancipated. This is seen as particularly telling because this was the primary argument of Davy and Hargrave. If Murray had wanted to emancipate the slaves completely, there were various bits of judicial precedent he could have based his decision on, such as Smith v Gould or Shanley v Harvey, but he did not. Various comments he made before and during the case also suggest that complete emancipation was not his intent; in a preliminary judgment he said that "the setting 14,000 or 15,000 men at once free loose by a solemn opinion, is much disagreeable in the effect it threatens", which one modern legal scholar interprets as indicative of his reluctance to make a decision for fear of economic consequences. Various comments he made to Thomas Hutchinson in private letters, along with his comments about the Somersett decision in R v Inhabitants of Thames Ditton also suggest that emancipation was not his goal. In the 1785 Inhabitants of Thames Ditton case, Lord Mansfield expressed the view that his ruling in the Somerset case decided only that a slave could not be forcibly removed from England against his will.

Mansfield and Lady Finch did not have any children. His title, which succeeds to this day, passed to his nephew, David Murray, 2nd Earl of Mansfield.

== Honours ==
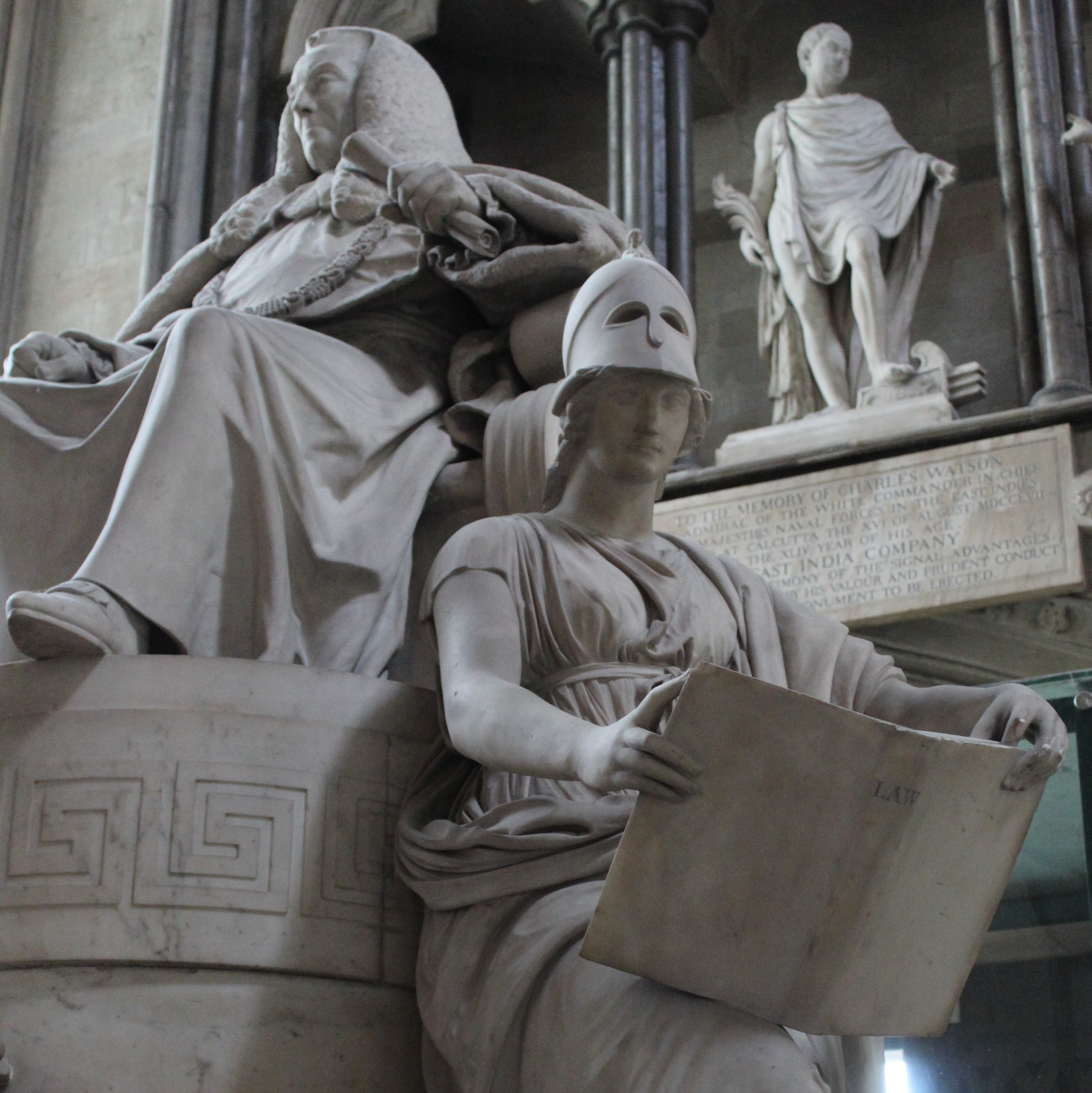
Monument to Mansfield in Westminster Abbey, with a figure representing Wisdom

Mansfield is immortalised in St Stephen's Hall, where he and other notable Parliamentarians look on at visitors to Parliament.

- In 1801 a large marble monument to him by John Flaxman was installed in Westminster Abbey; it shows a seated Murray flanked by the personifications of Wisdom and Justice, with an inscription that reads:

'Here Murray long enough his country's pride is now no more than Tully or than Hyde'. Foretold by Ar. Pope and fulfilled in the year 1793 when William Earl of Mansfield died full of years and of honours: of honours he declined many: those which he accepted were the following: he was appointed Solicitor General 1742, Attorney General 1754, Lord Chief Justice and Baron Mansfield 1756, Earl of Mansfield 1776. From the love which he bore to the place of his early education, he desired to be buried in this cathedral (privately) and would have forbidden that instance of human vanity, the erecting a monument to his memory, but a sum which with the interest has amounted to two thousand five hundred pounds was left for that purpose by A. Bailey Esqr. of Lyon's Inn, which at least well meant mark of esteem he had no previous knowledge or suspicion of and had no power to prevent being executed. He was the fourth son of David, fifth Viscount Stormont, and married the Lady Elizabeth Finch, daughter to Daniel, Earl of Nottingham by whom he had no issue. Born at Scone 2nd March 1704. Died at Kenwood 20th March 1793.

- The town of Mansfield, Massachusetts was named after him.
- Because of his reputation as a barrister, Lincoln's Inn offer a series of scholarship for the Bar Vocational Course named the Lord Mansfield Scholarship.
- Mansfield has been portrayed as a character several times in television and film – in The Fight Against Slavery (1975) by John Richmond, The British (2012) by Timothy West, Belle (2013) by Tom Wilkinson and The Scandalous Lady W (2015) by David Calder.

== Character ==
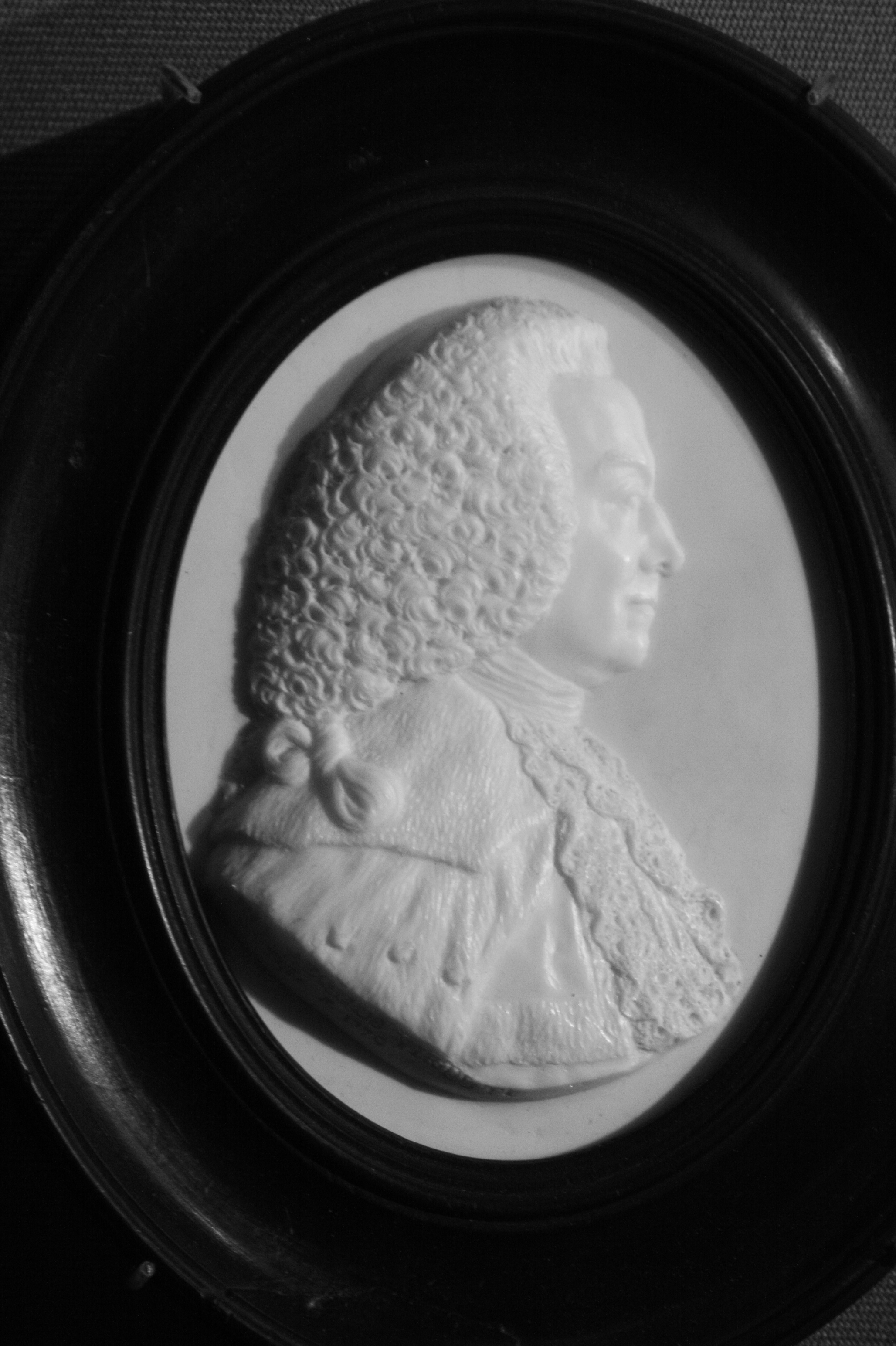
Cameo of William Murray, 1st Earl of Mansfield

Mansfield was noted at the Bar, in Parliament, and while sitting as a judge, for his eloquence and skill as a speaker; in particular Philip Stanhope, 4th Earl of Chesterfield described him as "beyond comparison the best speaker" in the House of Commons. He was also a hard worker; he would sometimes do court paperwork himself, as well as do his judicial duties, in an attempt to speed up the legal process.

He was summarised by Gareth Jones as "Conservative, urbane, silver-tongued, energetic, cultivated and well read; a highly imaginative lawyer who looked to reason and was not overawed by the legacy of the past". Edmund Burke, a contemporary, said that "he had some superiors in force, some equals in persuasion; but in insinuation he was without a rival. He excelled in the statement of a case. This, of itself, was worth the argument of any other man". The comment by Samuel Johnson that "Much may be made of a [Scotsman], if he be caught young" was directed at Mansfield, and Johnson also described him as "more than a mere lawyer", while Edward Coke, who is considered one of the most important lawyers in the history of English law, was "only a lawyer".

Unlike other barristers, Mansfield was noted for always keeping a cool head and being "prudent to the point of timidity". He was criticised for being "moderate and dispassionate", unlike more aggressive barristers such as Edward Coke; when asked about this he replied that "I would not have made Sir Edward Coke's speech to gain all Sir Edward Coke's estates and all his reputation". There are conflicting reports about his temperament and attitude as a judge; William Pitt described him as "a very bad judge, proud, haughty to the Bar and hasty in his determinations", and Charles Yorke said he was "offensive and unpopular". Both opinions are suspect, however; Pitt's because he was a constant rival to Mansfield and Yorke's because he was attempting to beat Mansfield to the position of Lord Chancellor at the time. Edward Foss said that "there has never been a judge more venerated by his contemporaries, nor whose memory is regarded with greater respect and affection", and described him as "the great oracle of law".

Mansfield has been called "the legal genius of his generation", and compared favourably with Joseph Story, a judge of the Supreme Court of the United States noted for his brilliance. Other Americans such as Julian S. Waterman, the founder of the University of Arkansas School of Law, described him as "not only the greatest common law judge but the greatest judge in Anglo-American legal history", while Joseph Story himself said that Mansfield "broke down the narrow barrier of the common law, redeemed it from feudal selfishness and barbarity" and that "he was one of those great men raised up by Providence, at a fortunate moment, to effect a salutary revolution in the world".

== In popular culture ==
In the 2013 film Belle, Murray is portrayed by Tom Wilkinson.

In the 2015 film The Scandalous Lady W, Murray is portrayed by David Calder.

== See also ==
- List of cases involving Lord Mansfield

== Bibliography ==
- Baker, John (2002). An Introduction to English Legal History (4th ed.). Butterworths. ISBN 978-0-406-93053-8.
- Butcher, Christopher (2008). "Good faith in insurance law: a redundant concept?". Journal of Business Law. 5: 375–384. ISSN 0021-9460.
- Chisholm, Hugh, ed. (1911). "Mansfield, William Murray" . Encyclopædia Britannica. Vol. 17 (11th ed.). Cambridge University Press. pp. 600–601.
- Van Cleve, George (Autumn 2006). "Somerset's Case and Its Antecedents in Imperial Perspective". Law and History Review. 24 (3): 601–646. doi:10.1017/S073824800000081X. ISSN 0738-2480. S2CID 145793676.
- Cornish, William (2009). "Conserving culture and copyright: a partial history". Edinburgh Law Review. 13 (1): 8–26. doi:10.3366/E1364980908000942. ISSN 1364-9809.
- Fifoot, Cecil (1936). Lord Mansfield. Clarendon Press. ISBN 978-3-511-09053-1.
- Fisher, Ruth Anna (October 1943). "Granville Sharp and Lord Mansfield". The Journal of Negro History. 28 (4): 381–389. doi:10.2307/2714946. ISSN 1548-1867. JSTOR 2714946. S2CID 149909453.
- Foss, Edward (1870). A Biographical Dictionary of the Justices of England (1066–1870). Spottiswoode and Company. OCLC 181068114.
- Heward, Edmund (1979). Lord Mansfield: A Biography of William Murray 1st Earl of Mansfield 1705–1793 Lord Chief Justice for 32 years. Chichester: Barry Rose (publishers) Ltd. ISBN 978-0-85992-163-3.
- Jones, Gareth (November 1980). "Book Reviews - Lord Mansfield by Edmund Heward". The Cambridge Law Journal. 39 (2). ISSN 0008-1973. JSTOR 4506285.
- Leslie, William (October 1957). "Similarities in Lord Mansfield's and Joseph Story's View of Fundamental Law". The American Journal of Legal History. 1 (4): 278–307. doi:10.2307/844022. ISSN 0002-9319. JSTOR 844022.
- Lowry, Todd (December 1973). "Lord Mansfield and the Law Merchant: Law and Economics in the Eighteenth Century". Journal of Economic Issues. 7 (4): 605–622. doi:10.1080/00213624.1973.11503137. ISSN 0021-3624. JSTOR 4224261.
- Krikler, Jeremy (2007). "The Zong and the Lord Chief Justice". History Workshop Journal. 64: 29–47. doi:10.1093/hwj/dbm035. S2CID 144154697.
- McKendrick, Ewan (2007). Contract Law (7th ed.). Palgrave Macmillan. ISBN 978-0-230-01883-9.
- Poser, Norman S. (2013). Lord Mansfield: Justice in the Age of Reason. Montreal: McGill-Queen's University Press. ISBN 9780773541832. JSTOR j.ctt32b79b.
- Plunkett, Theodore (1956). A Concise History of the Common Law (5 ed.). Boston: Little, Brown and Company. OCLC 933912.
- Shaw, Thomas (1926). "The Enlightenment of Lord Mansfield". Journal of Comparative Legislation and International Law. 8 (1): 1–8. ISSN 1479-5949. JSTOR 752986.
- Waterman, Julian S. (March 1934). "Mansfield and Blackstone's Commentaries". The University of Chicago Law Review. 1 (4): 549–571. doi:10.2307/1596998. ISSN 0041-9494. JSTOR 1596998.
- Watson, Alan (2006). "Lord Mansfield; Judicial Integrity or Its Lack; Somerset's Case". Journal of Comparative Law. 1 (2): 225–234.

Legal offices
| Preceded by John Strange | Solicitor General; 1742–54 | Succeeded by Sir Richard Lloyd |
| Preceded by Sir Dudley Ryder | Attorney General; 1754–56 | Succeeded by Sir Robert Henley |
| Preceded by Sir Dudley Ryder | Lord Chief Justice of the King's Bench; 1756–88 | Succeeded by Lloyd Kenyon |
Political offices
| Preceded by The Earl of Hardwicke as Lord Chancellor | Lord Speaker; 1783 | Succeeded by The Earl of Northington as Lord Chancellor |
| Preceded by Henry Bilson Legge | Chancellor of the Exchequer; 1757 | Succeeded by Henry Bilson Legge |
Parliament of Great Britain
| Preceded by James Tyrrell; George Gregory | Member of Parliament for Boroughbridge; 1742–56; With: George Gregory 1742–46; Earl of Dalkeith 1746–50; Hon. Lewis Monson Watson 1750–54; John Fuller 1754–55; Sir Cecil Bishopp 1755–56 | Succeeded by Sir Cecil Bishopp; Earl of Euston |
Peerage of Great Britain
| New creation | Earl of Mansfield; 1st creation 1776–1793 | Succeeded by Louisa Murray |
| New creation | Earl of Mansfield; 2nd creation 1792–1793 | Succeeded by David Murray |
| New creation | Baron Mansfield; 1756–1793 | Extinct |
