= Matthew Flinders (academic) =

British academic and political scientist

Matthew V. Flinders (born 1972) is a British academic and political scientist. From July 2014 until April 2017 he was Chair of the Executive Committee of Trustees of the Political Studies Association.

Flinders did his undergraduate degree at Loughborough University before completing his PhD in public policy and governance at the University of Sheffield. He teaches on the undergraduate politics degree at the University of Sheffield and has written a number of academic books. His main area of expertise is British governance. He obtained a departmental chair in 2009, and is deputy head of the department. He is also Founding Professor of the Sir Bernard Crick Centre.

Flinders's book Delegated Governance and the British State: Walking without Order won the 2009 W. J. M. Mackenzie Prize, awarded by the Political Studies Association for the best book published in 2008. In 2026 he was awarded the Isaiah Berlin Prize of the Political Studies Association for outstanding professional contributions to political studies.

== Selected publications ==
- Flinders, M.V. (2008) Delegated governance and the British state: walking without order, Oxford University Press.
- Brazier, A., Flinders, M. and McHugh, D. (eds.) (2005) New politics, new parliament? : a review of parliamentary modernisation since 1997, Published by Hansard Society.
- Bache, I. and Flinders, M. (eds.) (2004) Multi-level governance, Oxford University Press.
- Flinders, M. (2001) The politics of accountability in the modern state, Ashgate.
- Flinders, M. V. (2000) The politics of accountability : the enduring centrality of individual ministerial responsibility within the British constitution, (Dissertation: University of Sheffield).
- Flinders, M., Smith, M. (1999) Quangos, accountability and reform : the politics of quasi-government, Macmillan.
- Flinders, M.V., Harden, I. and Marquand, D. (eds.) (1997) How to make quangos democratic, Published by Charter88 in association with PERC.
