= Constitution of the United Kingdom =

Uncodified national constitution

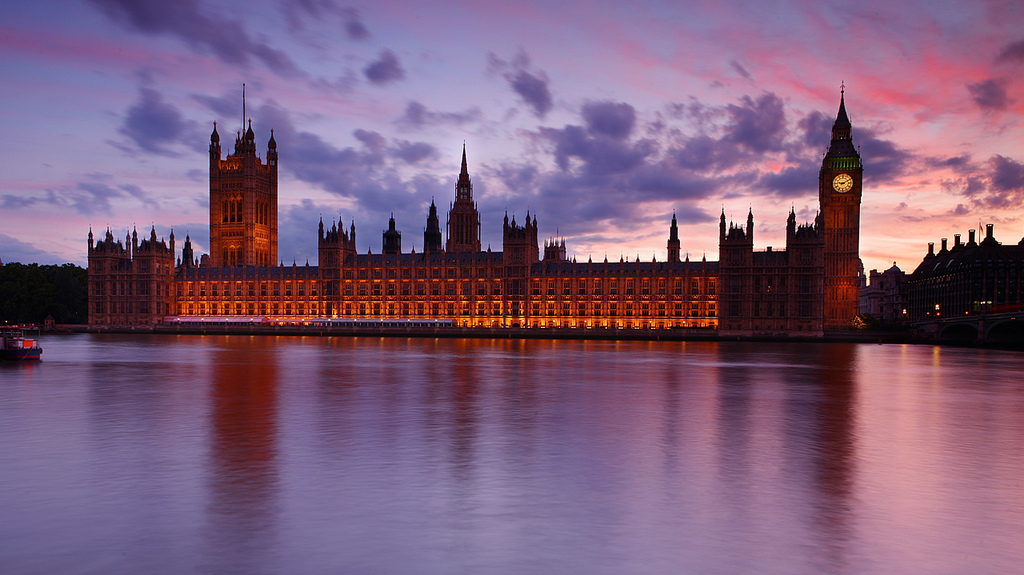
Parliament is central to the United Kingdom's democratic constitution. In the Palace of Westminster the House of Commons represents the public in 650 UK constituencies and chooses the prime minister at will. The House of Lords remains unelected but can be overruled.

The constitution of the United Kingdom comprises the written and unwritten arrangements that establish the United Kingdom of Great Britain and Northern Ireland as a political body. Unlike in most countries, no official attempt has been made to codify such arrangements into a single document, thus it is known as an uncodified constitution. This enables the constitution to be easily changed as no provisions are formally entrenched.

The Supreme Court of the United Kingdom and its predecessor, the Appellate Committee of the House of Lords, have recognised and affirmed constitutional principles such as parliamentary sovereignty, the rule of law, democracy, and upholding international law. It also recognises that some Acts of Parliament have special constitutional status. These include the Magna Carta, which in 1215 required the King of England to call a "common counsel" (now called Parliament) to represent the people, to hold courts in a fixed place, to guarantee fair trials, to guarantee free movement of people, to free the church from the state, and to guarantee rights of "common" people to use the land. Following the English conquest of Wales, the Laws in Wales Acts 1535 and 1542 integrated Wales into England. After the Glorious Revolution, the Bill of Rights 1689 and the Claim of Right Act 1689 cemented Parliament's position as the supreme law-making body, and said that the "election of members of Parliament ought to be free". The Treaty of Union in 1706 and the Acts of Union 1707 united the Kingdoms of England and Scotland, the Acts of Union 1800 joined Ireland, but the Irish Free State separated after the Anglo-Irish Treaty in 1922, leaving Northern Ireland within the UK. After struggles for universal suffrage, the UK guaranteed every adult citizen over 21 years the equal right to vote in the Representation of the People (Equal Franchise) Act 1928. After World War II, the UK became a founding member of the Council of Europe to uphold human rights, and the United Nations to guarantee international peace and security. The UK was a member of the European Union, joining its predecessor in 1973, but left in 2020. The UK is also a founding member of the International Labour Organization and the World Trade Organization to participate in regulating the global economy.

The leading institutions in the United Kingdom's constitution are Parliament, the judiciary, the executive, and regional and local governments, including the devolved legislatures and executives of Scotland, Wales, and Northern Ireland. Parliament is the supreme law-making body, and represents the people of the United Kingdom. The House of Commons is elected by a democratic vote in the country's 650 constituencies. The House of Lords is mostly appointed by cross-political party groups from the House of Commons, and can delay but not block legislation from the Commons. To make a new Act of Parliament, the highest form of law, both Houses must read, amend, or approve proposed legislation three times and the monarch must give consent. The judiciary interprets the law found in Acts of Parliament and develops the law established by previous cases. The highest court is the twelve-person Supreme Court, as it decides appeals from the Courts of Appeal in England, Wales, and Northern Ireland, or the Court of Session in Scotland. UK courts cannot decide that Acts of Parliament are unconstitutional or invalidate them, but can declare that they are incompatible with the European Convention on Human Rights. They can determine whether the acts of the executive are lawful. The executive is led by the prime minister, who must maintain the confidence of a majority of the members of the House of Commons. The prime minister appoints the cabinet of other ministers, who lead the executive departments, staffed by civil servants, such as the Department of Health and Social Care which runs the National Health Service, or the Department for Education which funds schools and universities.

The monarch in their public capacity, known as the Crown, embodies the state. Laws can only be made by or with the authority of the Crown in Parliament, all judges sit in place of the Crown and all ministers act in the name of the Crown. The monarch is for the most part a ceremonial figurehead and has not refused assent to any new law since the Scottish Militia Bill in 1708. The monarch is bound by constitutional convention.

In addition to the UK Parliament which holds supreme authority, there has been devolution granted to Scotland, Wales, and Northern Ireland through respective parliaments of the Scottish Parliament, Senedd (formally the National Assembly for Wales), and Northern Ireland Assembly which all have legislative powers. In England there is the Greater London Authority and Combined Authorities which hold oversight powers and general responsibility. Ultimate authority still resides in the UK Parliament and has passed some laws such as the United Kingdom Internal Markets Act 2020.

Most constitutional questions arise in judicial review applications, to decide whether the decisions or acts of public bodies are lawful. Every public body can only act in accordance with the law, laid down in Acts of Parliament and the decisions of the courts. Under the Human Rights Act 1998, courts may review government action to decide whether the government has followed the statutory obligation on all public authorities to comply with the European Convention on Human Rights. Convention rights include everyone's rights to life, liberty against arbitrary arrest or detention, torture, and forced labour or slavery, to a fair trial, to privacy against unlawful surveillance, to freedom of expression, conscience and religion, to respect for private life, to freedom of association including joining trade unions, and to freedom of assembly and protest.

== Principles ==
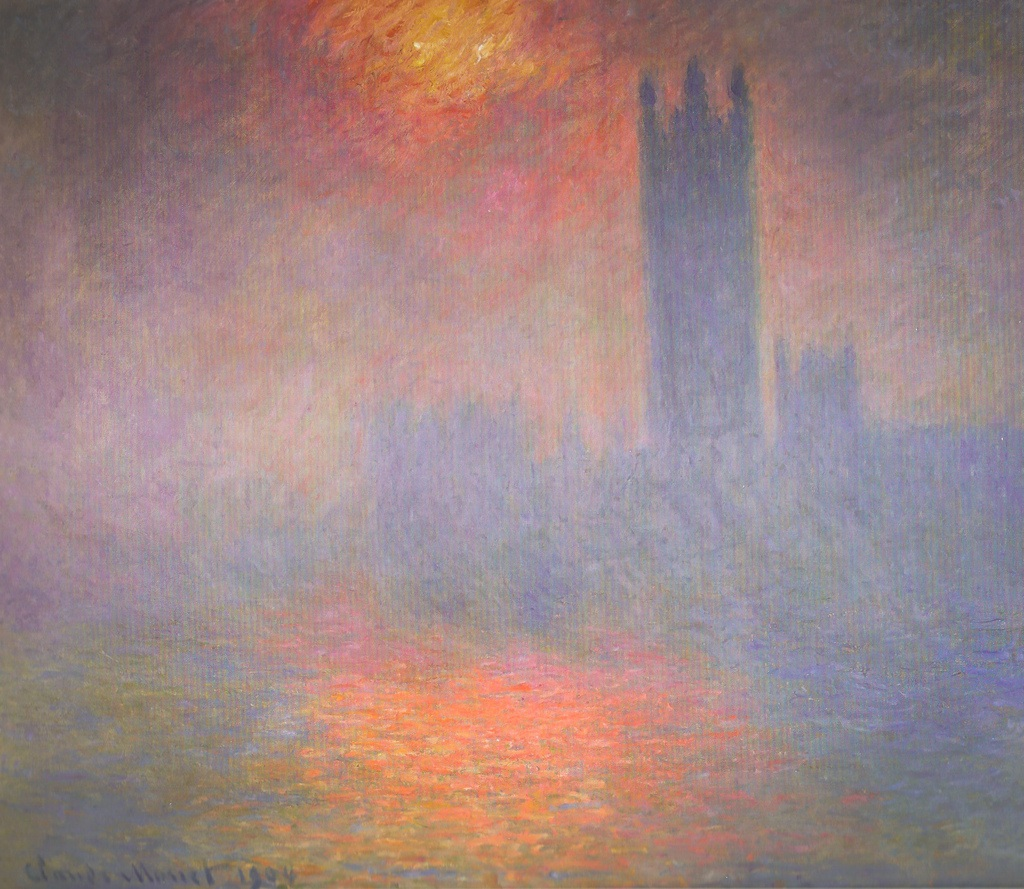
(London, Houses of Parliament. The Sun Shining through the Fog by Claude Monet, 1904). Parliament (from French, parler, "to talk") is the UK's highest law-making body.

Although the British constitution is not codified, the Supreme Court recognises constitutional principles, and constitutional statutes, which shape the use of political power. There are at least four main constitutional principles recognised by the courts. First, parliamentary sovereignty means that Acts of Parliament are the supreme source of law. Through the English Reformation, the Civil War, the Glorious Revolution of 1688 and the Acts of Union 1707, Parliament became the dominant branch of the state, above the judiciary, executive, monarchy, and church. Parliament can make or unmake any law, a fact that is usually justified by Parliament being democratically elected, and upholding the rule of law, including human rights and international law.

Second, the rule of law has run through the constitution as a fundamental principle from the earliest times as "The king must [be] ... under the law, because the law makes the king" (Henry de Bracton in the 13th century). This principle was recognised in Magna Carta and the Petition of Right 1628. This means the government may only conduct itself according to legal authority, including respect for human rights.

Third, at least since 1928, elections in which all capable adults participate have become a fundamental constitutional principle. Originally only wealthy, property-owning men held rights to vote for the House of Commons, while the monarch, occasionally together with a hereditary House of Lords, dominated politics. From 1832 onwards, adult citizens slowly obtained the right to universal suffrage.

Fourth, the British constitution is bound to international law, as Parliament has chosen to increase its practical power in cooperation with other countries in international organisations, such as the International Labour Organization, the United Nations, the European Convention on Human Rights, the World Trade Organization, and the International Criminal Court. However, the UK left membership of the European Union in 2020 after a referendum in 2016.

=== Parliamentary sovereignty ===
Parliamentary sovereignty is often seen as a central element in the British constitution, although its extent is contested. It means that an Act of Parliament is the highest form of law, but also that "Parliament cannot bind itself". Historically, Parliament became sovereign through a series of power struggles between the monarch, the church, the courts, and the people. Magna Carta in 1215, which came from the conflict leading to the First Barons' War, granted the right of Parliament to exist for "common counsel" before any tax, against the "divine right of kings" to rule.

Common land was guaranteed to people to farm, graze, hunt or fish, though aristocrats continued to dominate politics. In the Act of Supremacy 1534, King Henry VIII asserted his divine right over the Catholic Church in Rome, declaring himself the supreme leader of the Church of England. Then in the Earl of Oxford's case in 1615, the Lord Chancellor (both the King's representative and head of the judiciary) asserted the supremacy of the Court of Chancery over the common law courts, contradicting Sir Edward Coke's assertion that judges could declare statutes void if they went "against common right and reason".

After the Glorious Revolution of 1688, the Bill of Rights 1689 cemented Parliament's power over the monarch, and therefore over the church and courts. Parliament became "sovereign", and supreme. 18 years later however, the English Parliament abolished itself in order to create the new Parliament following on the Treaty of Union between England and Scotland, while the Scottish Parliament did likewise. Power struggles within Parliament continued between the aristocracy and common people. Outside Parliament, people from the Chartists to the trade unions fought for the vote in the House of Commons. The Parliament Act 1911 ensured the Commons would prevail in any conflict over the unelected House of Lords. The Parliament Act 1949 ensured the Lords could only delay legislation by one year, and not delay any budgetary measure over a month.

In a leading case, R (Jackson) v Attorney General, a group of pro-hunting protestors challenged the Hunting Act 2004's ban on fox hunting, arguing it was not a valid Act because it was passed avoiding the House of Lords, using the Parliament Acts. They argued that the 1949 Act itself was passed using the 1911 Act's power to override the Lords in two years. The claimants argued that this meant the 1949 Act should not be considered a valid law, because the 1911 Act was limited in scope and could not be used to amend its own limitation of the Lords' power. The House of Lords, sitting as the UK's highest court, rejected this argument, holding both the Parliament Act 1949 and the Hunting Act 2004 to be valid. However, in obiter dicta Lord Hope argued that Parliamentary sovereignty "is no longer, if it ever was, absolute", and that the "rule of law enforced by the courts is the ultimate controlling factor on which our constitution is based", and cannot be used to defend unconstitutional Acts (as determined by the courts). There is not yet a consensus on the meaning of "Parliamentary sovereignty", except that its legitimacy depends on the principle of "the democratic process".

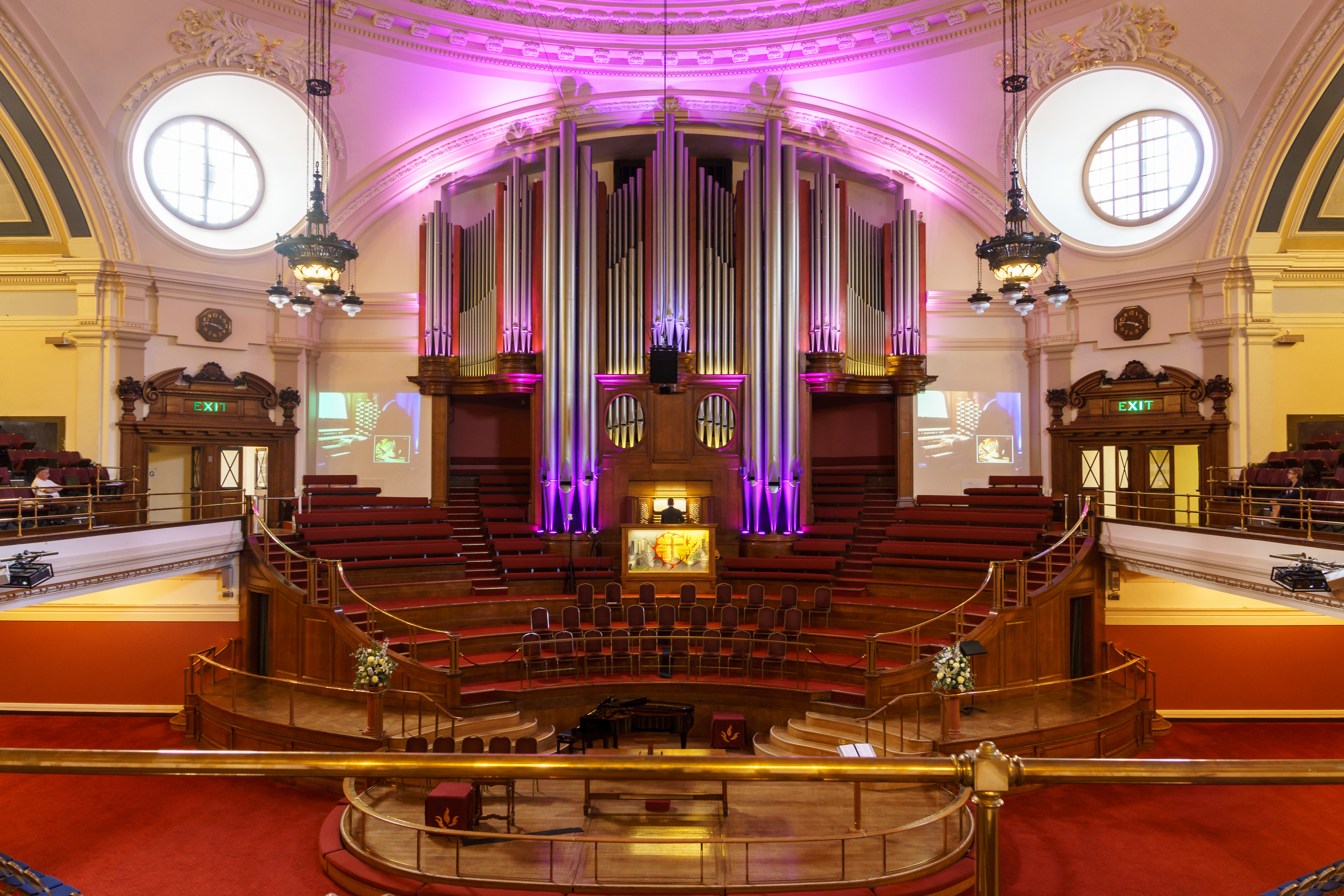
The UK has committed to international law as a "sovereign" member, to augment its power through cooperation, in the United Nations since 1945. The first UN General Assembly was held at Methodist Central Hall, opened by Prime Minister Clement Attlee.

In recent history, Parliament's sovereignty has evolved in four main ways. First, since 1945 international cooperation meant Parliament augmented its power by working with, not dominating, other sovereign nations. While Parliament had nearly uncontested power before, and so was thought by writers of the Imperial period to be able to "make or unmake any law whatever", the UK chose to join the League of Nations in 1919, and after its failure, the United Nations in 1945, to participate in building a system of international law.

The Treaty of Versailles in 1919 recalled that "peace can only be established if it is based upon social justice", and the UN Charter, "based on the principle of the sovereign equality of all its Members", said that "to save succeeding generations from the scourge of war, which twice in our lifetime has brought untold sorrow to mankind", the UN would "reaffirm faith in fundamental human rights", and members should "live together in peace with one another as good neighbours". The Bretton Woods Agreements Act 1945, United Nations Act 1946 and International Organisations Act 1968 wrote the UK's funding and membership of the United Nations, the International Monetary Fund, the World Bank, and other bodies, into law. For example, the UK bound itself to implement by order UN Security Council resolutions, up to the actual use of force, in return for representation in the General Assembly and Security Council.

Although the UK has not always clearly followed international law, it has accepted as a formal duty that its sovereignty would not be used unlawfully. Second, in 1950 the UK helped to write and joined the European Convention on Human Rights. While that convention reflected norms and cases decided under British statutes and the common law on civil liberties, the UK accepted that people could appeal to the European Court of Human Rights in Strasbourg, if domestic remedies were not enough. In the Human Rights Act 1998, Parliament decided that the British judiciary should be required to apply human rights norms directly in determining British cases, to ensure a more speedy, human rights-based resolution to case law, and effectively influence human rights reasoning more.

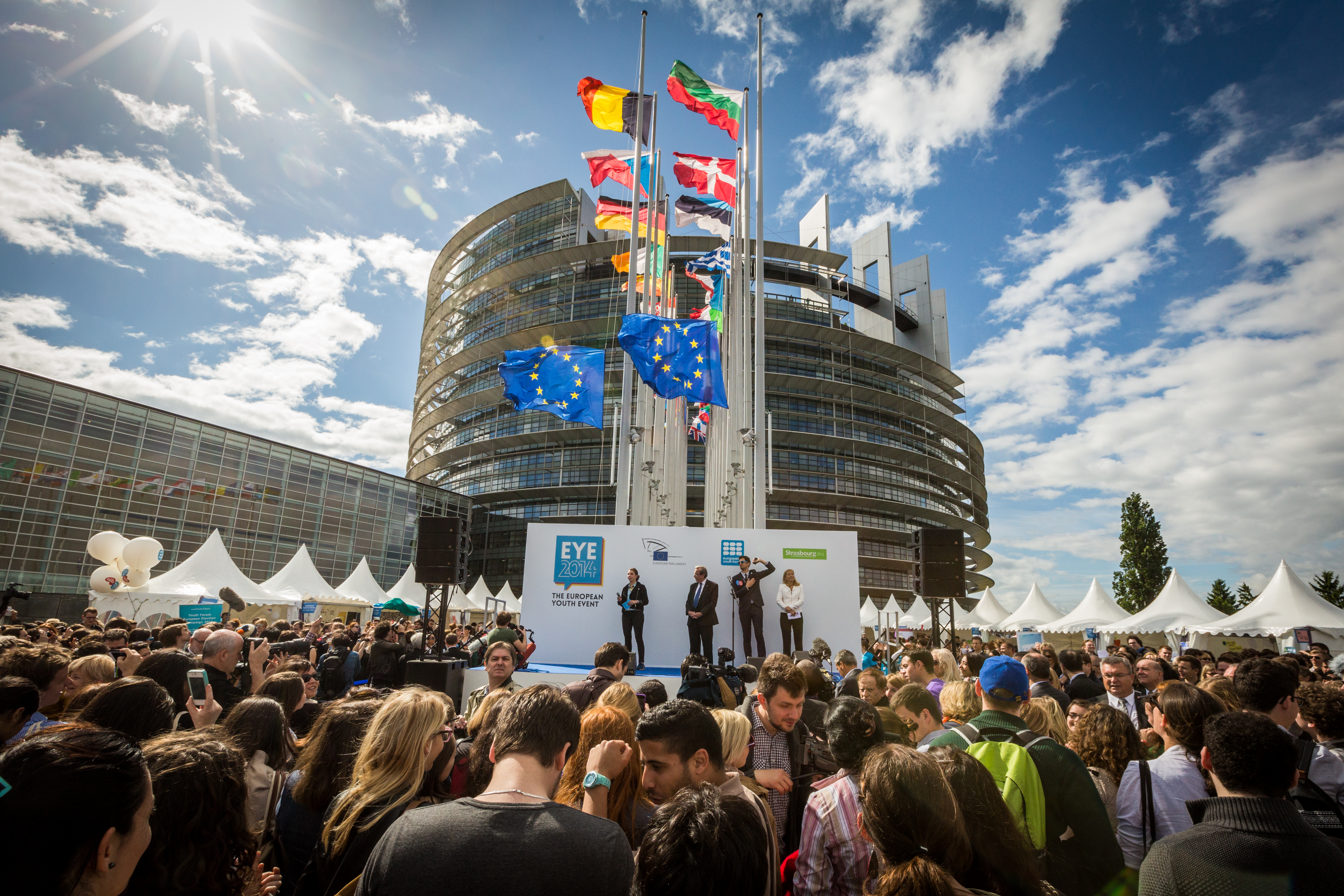
From 1973 to 2020, the UK was a member state of the European Union (and its predecessor organisation the European Communities), which is committed to "human dignity, freedom, democracy, equality, the rule of law and respect for human rights".

Third, the UK became a member of the European Union after the European Communities Act 1972 and through its ratification of the Maastricht Treaty in 1992. The idea of a Union had long been envisaged by European leaders, including Winston Churchill, who in 1946 had called for a "United States of Europe". EU law has long been held to prevail in any conflict between Acts of Parliament for the limited fields in which it operates, but member states and citizens gain control over the scope of EU law, and so extend their sovereignty in international affairs, through joint representation in the European Parliament, Council of the European Union, and the Commission. This principle was tested in R (Factortame Ltd) v Secretary of State for Transport, where a fishing business claimed that it should not be required to have 75% of British shareholders, as the Merchant Shipping Act 1988 said.

Under EU law, the principle of freedom of establishment states that nationals of any member state can freely incorporate and run a business across the EU without unjustified interference. The House of Lords held that, because the EU law conflicted with the sections of the 1988 Act, those sections would not be enforced, and disapplied, because Parliament had not clearly expressed an intention to renounce the 1972 Act. According to Lord Bridge "whatever limitation of its sovereignty Parliament accepted when it enacted the [1972 Act] was entirely voluntary". It was, therefore, the duty of the courts to apply EU law.

On the other hand, in R (HS2 Action Alliance Ltd) v Secretary of State for Transport the Supreme Court held that certain fundamental principles of British constitutional law would not be interpreted by the courts as having been given up by membership of the EU, or probably any international organisation. Here a group protesting against the High Speed 2 rail line from London to Manchester and Leeds claimed that the government had not properly followed an Environmental Impact Assessment Directive by whipping a vote in Parliament to approve the plan. They argued that the Directive required open and free consultation, which was not fulfilled if a party whip compelled party members to vote. The Supreme Court unanimously held the Directive did not require that no party whip occurred, but if a conflict had existed a Directive would not be able to compromise the fundamental constitutional principle from the Bill of Rights that Parliament is free to organise its affairs.

Fourth, devolution in the United Kingdom has meant Parliament gave the power to legislate on specific topics to nations and regions: the Scotland Act 1998 created the Scottish Parliament, the Government of Wales Act 1998 created the Welsh Assembly, the Northern Ireland Act 1998 created a Northern Ireland Executive following the historic Good Friday Agreement, to bring peace. In addition, the Local Government Act 1972 and the Greater London Authority Act 1999 give more limited powers to local and London governments. Practically, but also constitutionally, it has become increasingly accepted that decisions should not be taken for the UK which would override, and run counter to, the will of regional governments. However, in R (Miller) v Secretary of State for Exiting the European Union, a group of people who sought to remain in the European Union contested the government on whether the Prime Minister could trigger Article 50 to notify the European Commission of the UK's intention to leave, without an Act of Parliament. This followed the Brexit poll of 2016 where 51.9% of those voting voted to leave.

The claimants argued that, because Brexit would obliterate rights that Parliament had conferred through Acts of Parliament (such as the right of free movement of British citizens in the EU, the right to fair competition through merger control, and the right to vote for EU institutions) only Parliament could consent to notifying the intention to negotiate to leave under Article 50. They also argued that the Sewel Convention for devolved assemblies, where the assembly passes a motion that the Westminster Parliament can legislate on a devolved matter before it does so, meant the UK could not negotiate to leave without the Scottish, Welsh or Northern Ireland legislatures' consent. The Supreme Court held that the government could not begin the process of leaving purely through royal prerogative; Parliament must pass an Act enabling it to do so. However, the Sewel convention could not be enforced by courts, rather than observed. This led Prime Minister Theresa May to procure the European Union (Notification of Withdrawal) Act 2017, giving her power to notify the intention to leave the EU.

=== Rule of law ===
The rule of law has been regarded as a fundamental principle of modern legal systems, including the UK. It has been called "as important in a free society as the democratic franchise", and even "the ultimate controlling factor on which our constitution is based". Like parliamentary sovereignty, its meaning and extent is disputed. The most widely accepted meanings speak of several factors: Lord Bingham of Cornhill, formerly the highest judge in England and Wales, suggested the rule of law ought to mean that law is clear and predictable, not subject to broad or unreasonable discretion, applies equally to all people, with speedy and fair procedures for enforcement, protects fundamental human rights, and works according to international law.

Other definitions seek to exclude human rights and international law as relevant but largely stem from visions of pre-democratic scholars such as Albert Venn Dicey. The rule of law was explicitly recognised as a "constitutional principle" in section 1 of the Constitutional Reform Act 2005, which limited the judicial role of the Lord Chancellor and recast the judicial appointments system to entrench independence, diversity and merit. As the statute gives no further definition, the practical meaning of the "rule of law" develops through case law.

The European Court of Human Rights, following common law principles, protects the rule of law by requiring people's liberty, privacy or other rights are not infringed by the government unless there is a clear legal basis and justification.

At its core, the rule of law, in English and British law, has traditionally been the principle of "legality". This means that the state, government, and any person acting under government authority (including a corporation), may only act according to law. In 1765, in Entick v Carrington a writer, John Entick, claimed that the King's Chief Messenger, Nathan Carrington, had no legal authority to break into and ransack his home, and remove his papers. Carrington claimed he had authority from the secretary of state, Lord Halifax, who issued a search "warrant", but there was no statute that gave Lord Halifax the authority to issue search warrants. Lord Camden CJ held that the "great end, for which men entered into society, was to secure their property", and that without any authority "every invasion of private property, be it ever so minute, is a trespass." Carrington acted unlawfully and had to pay damages.

Today this principle of legality is found throughout the European Convention on Human Rights, which enables infringements of rights as a starting point only if "in accordance with the law". In 1979, in Malone v Metropolitan Police Commissioner a man charged with handling stolen goods claimed the police unlawfully tapped his phone, to get evidence. The only related statute, the Post Office Act 1969 Schedule 5, stated there should be no interference in telecommunications unless the secretary of state issued a warrant, but said nothing explicit about phone tapping. Megarry VC held there was no wrong at common law, and refused to interpret the statute in light of the right to privacy under the European Convention on Human Rights, article 8.

On appeal, the European Court of Human Rights concluded the convention was breached because the statute did not "indicate with reasonable clarity the scope and manner of exercise of the relevant discretion conferred on the public authorities." The judgement, however, was overshadowed by the government swiftly passing a new Act to authorise phone tapping with a warrant. By itself the principle of legality is not enough to alone preserve human rights in the face of ever more intrusive statutory powers of surveillance by corporations or government.

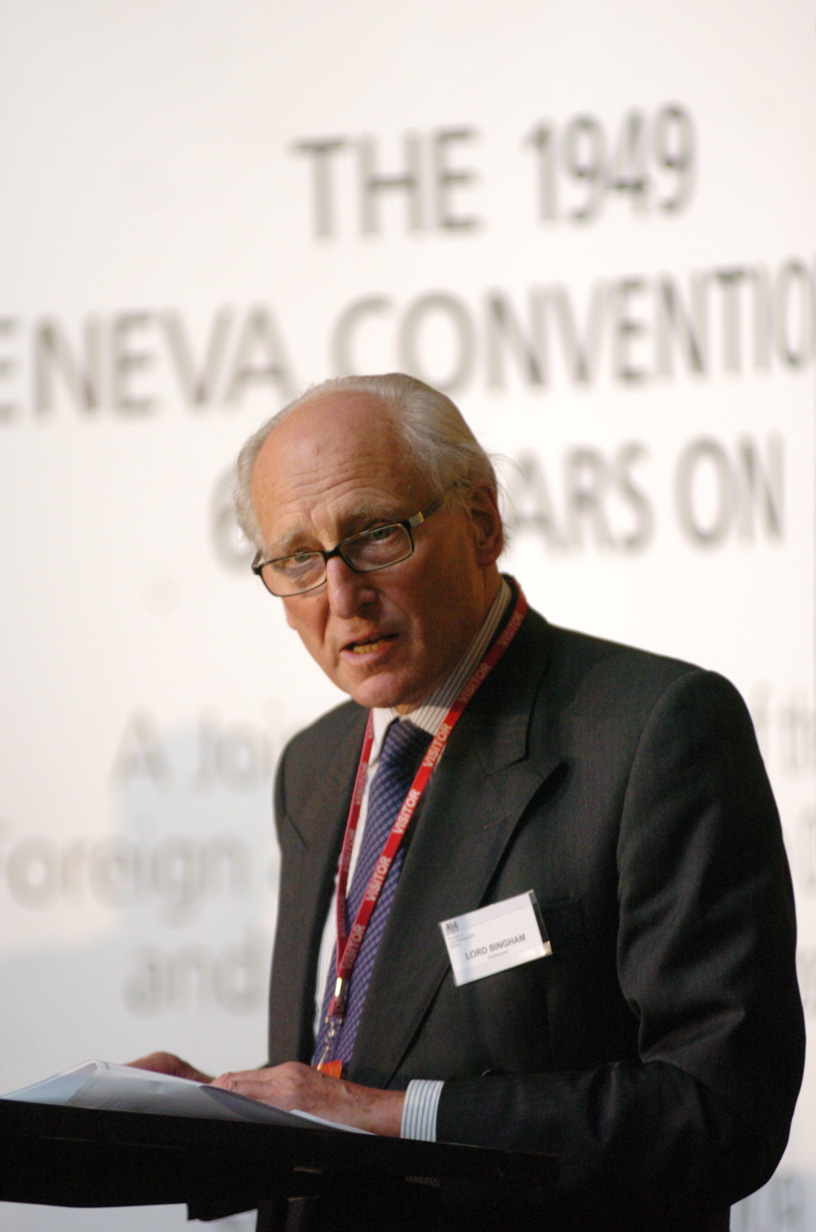
The most broadly accepted meaning of the rule of law, advocated by Lord Bingham of Cornhill, includes the principle of legality, human rights and commitment to democracy and international law.

The rule of law requires the law be truly enforced, though enforcement bodies may have room for discretion. In R (Corner House Research) v Director of the Serious Fraud Office, a group campaigning against the arms trade, Corner House Research, claimed the Serious Fraud Office acted unlawfully by dropping an investigation into the UK–Saudi Al-Yamamah arms deal. It was alleged that BAE Systems plc paid bribes to Saudi government figures. The House of Lords held the SFO was entitled to take into account the public interest in not pursuing an investigation, including the security threats that might transpire. Baroness Hale remarked that the SFO had to consider "the principle that no-one, including powerful British companies who do business for powerful foreign countries, is above the law", but the decision reached was not unreasonable. When enforcement or court proceedings do take place, they should proceed swiftly: anyone who is detained must be charged and put on trial or released.

People must also be able to access justice in practice. In R (UNISON) v Lord Chancellor the Supreme Court held the government's imposition of £1200 in fees to bring an employment tribunal claim undermined the rule of law, and was void. The Lord Chancellor had statutory authority to create fees for court services, but in the case of employment tribunals, his Order led to a 70% drop in claims against employers for breach of labour rights, such as unfair dismissal, unlawful wage deductions or discrimination. Lord Reed said the "constitutional right of access to the courts is inherent in the rule of law". Without access to courts, "laws are liable to become a dead letter, the work done by Parliament may be rendered nugatory, and the democratic election of Members of Parliament may become a meaningless charade." In principle every person is subject to the law, including government ministers, or corporate executives, who may be held in contempt of court for violating an order.

In other systems the idea of a separation of powers is seen as an essential part of maintaining the rule of law. In theory, originally advocated by Baron de Montesquieu, there should be a strict separation of the executive, legislature and judiciary. While other systems, notably the United States, attempted to put this into practice (e.g. requiring the executive does not come from the legislature), it is clear that modern political parties may undermine such a separation by capturing all three branches of government, and democracy has been maintained since the 20th century despite the fact that "there is no formal separation of powers in the United Kingdom".

The Constitutional Reform Act 2005 ended the practice of the Lord Chancellor sitting as the head of the judiciary, while also being a Member of Parliament, and sitting in the cabinet. Since the Act of Settlement 1700, there has been only one instance of a judge being removed, and a suspension cannot happen without the Lord Chief Justice and the Lord Chancellor following a judge being subject to criminal proceedings. There is now a duty on all ministers to "uphold the continued independence of the judiciary", including against assault by powerful corporations or the media.

=== Democracy ===
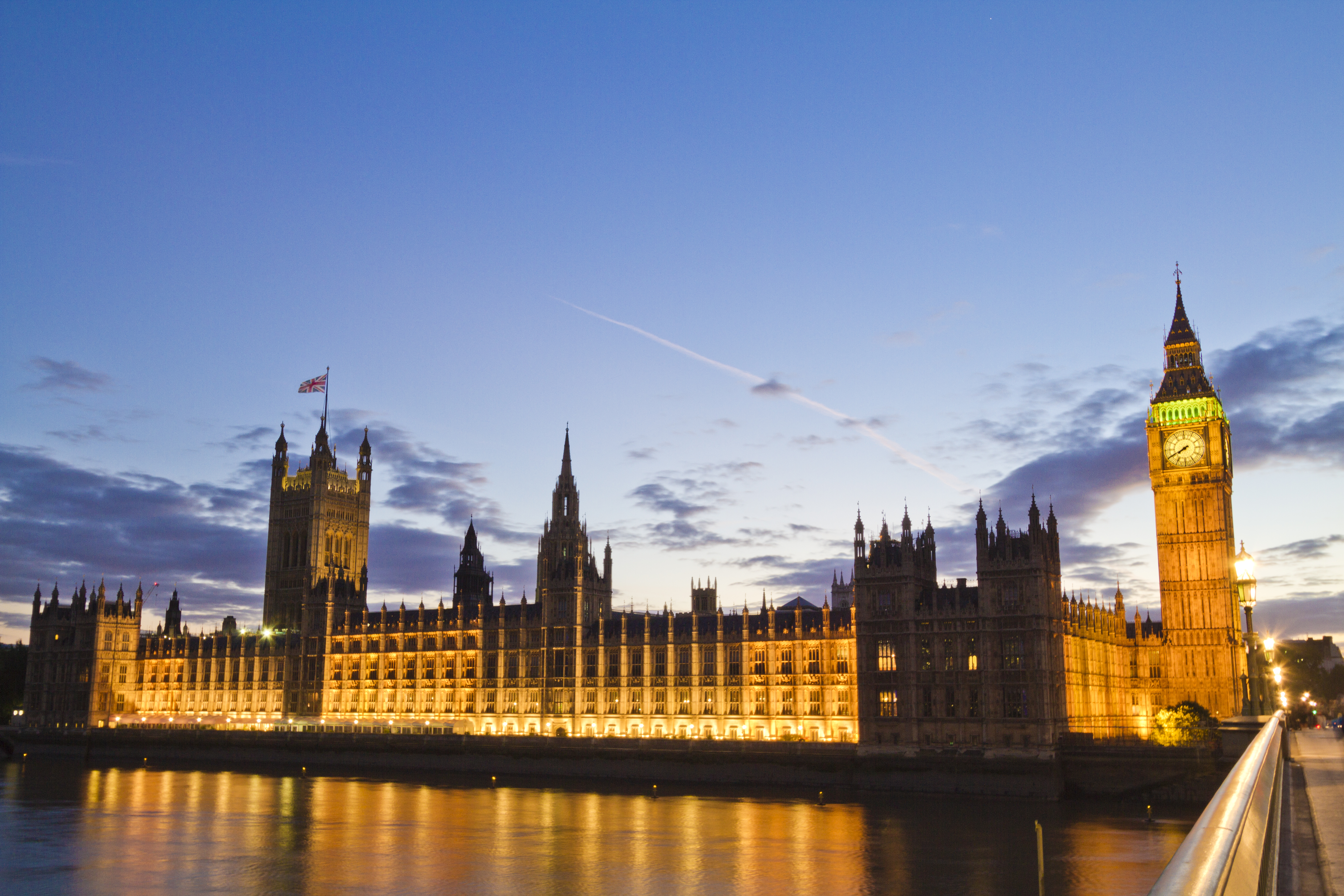
Parliament was recognised as a forum for the King for "common counsel" before Magna Carta.

The principle of a "democratic society", with a functioning representative and deliberative democracy, that upholds human rights, legitimises the fact of Parliamentary sovereignty, and it is widely considered that "democracy lies at the heart of the concept of the rule of law". The opposite of arbitrary power exercised by one person is "administration is in the hands of the many and not of the few". According to the preamble to the European Convention on Human Rights, as drafted by British lawyers following World War II, fundamental human rights and freedoms are themselves "best maintained ... by "an effective political democracy". Similarly, this "characteristic principle of democracy" is enshrined by the First Protocol, article 3, which requires the "right to free elections" to "ensure the free expression of the opinion of the people in the choice of the legislature". While there are many conceptions of democracy, such as "direct", "representative" or "deliberative", the dominant view in modern political theory is that democracy requires an active citizenry, not only in electing representatives, but in taking part in political life.

Its essence lies in not simply majority decision-making, nor referendums that can easily be used as a tool of manipulation, "but in the making of politically responsible decisions" and in "large-scale social changes maximising the freedom" of humankind. The legitimacy of law in a democratic society depends upon a constant process of deliberative discussion and public debate, rather than the imposition of decisions. It is also generally agreed that basic standards in political, social and economic rights are necessary to ensure everyone can play a meaningful role in political life. For this reason, the rights to free voting in fair elections and "general welfare in a democratic society" have developed hand-in-hand with all human rights, and form a fundamental cornerstone of international law.

In the UK's "modern democratic constitution", the principle of democracy is manifested through statutes and case law which guarantee the right to vote in fair elections, and through its use as a principle of interpretation by courts. In 1703, in the landmark case of Ashby v White, Lord Holt CJ stated that the right of everyone "to give [their] vote at the election of a person to represent [them] in Parliament, there to concur to the making of laws, which are to bind [their] liberty and property, is a most transcendent thing, and of a high nature". This has meant that the courts actively ensure that votes cast are counted and that democratic elections are conducted according to law. In Morgan v Simpson the Court of Appeal held that if a vote "was conducted so badly that it was not substantially in accordance with the law, " then it would be declared void, and so would even minor irregularities that would affect the result.

A considerable body of regulation, for instance in the Representation of the People Act 1983 or the Political Parties, Elections and Referendums Act 2000, restrict spending or any foreign interference because, according to Baroness Hale "each person has equal value" and "we do not want our government or its policies to be decided by the highest spenders". More broadly, the concept of a "democratic society" and what is "necessary" for its functioning underpins the entire scheme of interpretation for the European Convention on Human Rights as applied in British law, particularly after the Human Rights Act 1998, because each right can usually only be restricted if "in accordance with law" and as "necessary in a democratic society". The place of the social welfare state that is necessary to support democratic life is also manifested through the courts' interpretation. For instance, in Gorringe v Calderdale MBC, Lord Steyn, giving the leading judgement, said it was "necessary" to view the law of negligence in the context of "the contours of our social welfare state". More generally, the common law has been increasingly developed to be harmonious with statutory rights, and also in harmony with rights under international law.

=== Internationalism ===
Like other democratic countries, the principles of international law are a basic component of the British constitution, both as a primary tool of interpretation of domestic law and through the UK's consistent support and membership of major international organisations. As far back as Magna Carta, English law recognised the right to free movement of people for international trade. In 1608, Sir Edward Coke wrote confidently that international commercial law, or the lex mercatoria, is part of the laws of the realm. The constitutional crises of the 17th century centred upon Parliament halting the King's attempt to tax international trade without its consent. Similarly in the 18th century, Lord Holt CJ viewed international law as a general tool for interpretation of the common law, while Lord Mansfield in particular did more than any other to affirm that the international lex mercatoria "is not the law of a particular country but the law of all nations", and "the law of merchants and the law of the land is the same".

In 1774, in Somerset v Stewart, one of the most important cases in legal history, Lord Mansfield held that slavery was lawful "in no country" and therefore in common law.

In modern case law it has been consistently accepted that it "is a principle of legal policy that [British] law should conform to public international law." The House of Lords stressed that "there is a strong presumption in favour of interpreting English law (whether common law or statute) in a way which does not place the United Kingdom in breach of an international obligation." For example, in Hounga v Allen the Supreme Court held that a young lady who had been illegally trafficked to the UK had a right to bring a race discrimination claim against her employers, even though she had herself been in violation of the Immigration Act 1971.

In doing so, the court unanimously drew upon international treaties signed by the UK, known as the Palermo protocols, as well as the European Convention on Human Rights, in interpreting the scope of the common law doctrine of illegality, and held it was no bar for the claimant to assert her legal rights. It has been further debated whether the UK should adopt a theory of that sees international law as part of UK without any further act (a "monist" theory), or whether it should still be required for international law principles to be translated into domestic law (a "dualist" theory). The current position in European Union law is that while international law binds the EU, it cannot undermine fundamental principles of constitutional law or human rights.

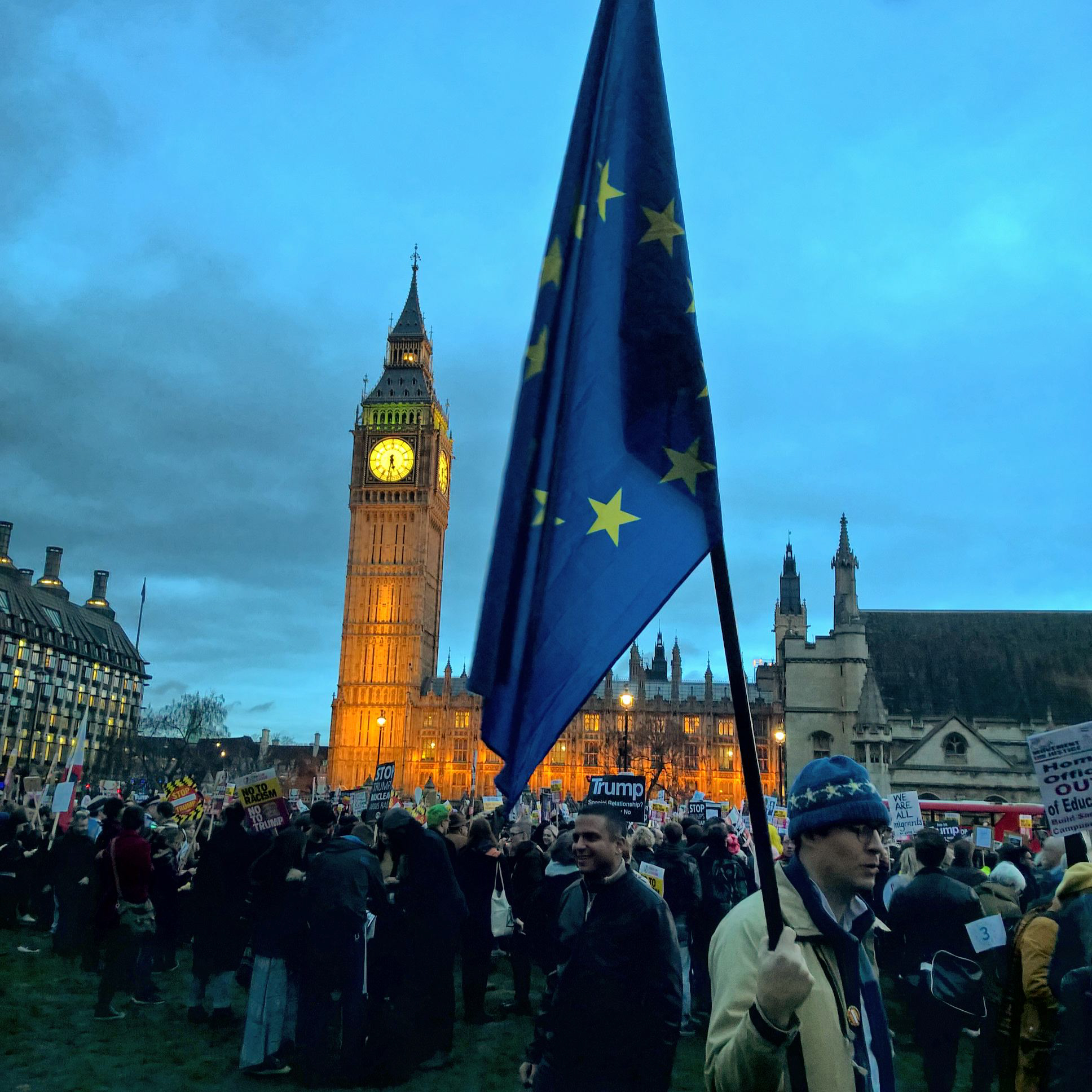
In the Brexit referendum 51.9% voted to leave the European Union, and 48.1% to remain. Critics have filed complaints about the substantiality of the question.

Since the World Wars brought an end to the British Empire and physically destroyed large parts of the country, the UK has consistently supported organisations formed under international law. From the Treaty of Versailles in 1919, the UK was a founding member of the International Labour Organization, which sets universal standards for people's rights at work. After the failure of the League of Nations and following World War II, the UK became a founding member of the United Nations, recognised by Parliament through the United Nations Act 1946, enabling any resolution of the Security Council except the use of force to be implemented by an Order in Council. Due the Universal Declaration of Human Rights in 1948, the continuation of the British Empire lost substantial legitimacy under international law, and combined with independence movements this led to its rapid dissolution.

Two fundamental treaties, the International Covenant on Civil and Political Rights and the International Covenant on Economic, Social and Cultural Rights in 1966, saw the UK ratify most rights from the Universal Declaration. Codifying the Ponsonby Rule from 1924, the Constitutional Reform and Governance Act 2010 section 20 stipulates that a treaty is ratified once it is laid before Parliament for 21 days and no adverse resolution is passed against it. Regionally, the UK participated in drafting the 1950 European Convention on Human Rights which sought to guarantee basic standards of democracy and human rights to preserve peace in post-war Europe. At the same time, following long-held visions for European integration with the UK "at the centre", democratic European countries sought to integrate their economies both to make war vain, and to advance social progress.

In 1972, the UK joined the European Communities (reorganised and renamed the European Union in 1992) and committed to implement EU law in which it participated, in the European Communities Act 1972. In 1995, the UK also became a founding member of the World Trade Organization. To ensure that the European Convention was directly applied by the courts, the Human Rights Act 1998 was passed. Parliament also passed the International Criminal Court Act 2001 to enable prosecution of war criminals, and subjected itself to the jurisdiction of the International Criminal Court. In 2016 the UK voted in a referendum on whether to leave the European Union, resulting—with a 72.2% turnout—in a margin of 51.9% favouring "leave" and 48.1% favouring "remain". Some allegations were made of misconduct taking place in the campaigns in support of both referendum options, whilst authorities found nothing considered serious enough to affect results and little to chastise.

== Sources ==
Due to the uncodified nature of the Constitution, there is no entrenched source of constitutional law. However, over time three main bodies of sources have emerged. The main sources of constitutional law are Acts of Parliament, court cases, and conventions in the way that government, Parliament and the monarch act.

=== Acts of Parliament ===
Laws that touch on topics such as the structure of government, rights of citizens and the powers of devolved assemblies become constitutionally significant simply by their subject matter and the sovereignty of parliament meaning that the specifics of the law becoming legally binding. This allows for the constitution to be amended whenever a law is made on a constitutionally significant topic.

Professor Robert Blackburn listed the following as an approximate selection of recent constitutionally significant acts:

- "The Parliament Acts (1911–49) that regulate the respective powers of the two Houses of Parliament.
- The Representation of the People Acts (1918) (as amended) providing for universal voting and other matters of political representation.
- The European Communities Act (1972) making the UK a legal partner in the European Union.
- The Scottish, Welsh and Northern Ireland devolution Acts of 1998 (as amended) creating an executive and legislature for each of those three nations in the UK.
- The Human Rights Act (1998) establishing a bill of rights and freedoms actionable by individuals through the courts."

=== Court cases ===
Via court cases, judges create common law when they decide legal proceedings. This means that in order to understand the common law, individual pieces of case law must be examined. Traditionally this system of precedent operated on the basis that the reason for the decision (ratio decidendi) in a superior court binds inferior courts, and judicial comments not necessary to decide the matter at hand are persuasive but non-binding obiter dicta. However, in R v Barton and Booth, the Court of Appeal unanimously held that the Supreme Court alone is capable of issuing binding directions in non-binding obiter. Academically this proposition has been heavily criticised.

=== Conventions ===
Conventions are often harder to pin down, and are agreements without hard legal force, but they remain an integral element of the constitution. Elements such as the leader of the party with a majority becoming prime minister, the House of Lords not vetoing secondary legislation and judges remaining impartial on government policy are all conventions.

== Institutions ==
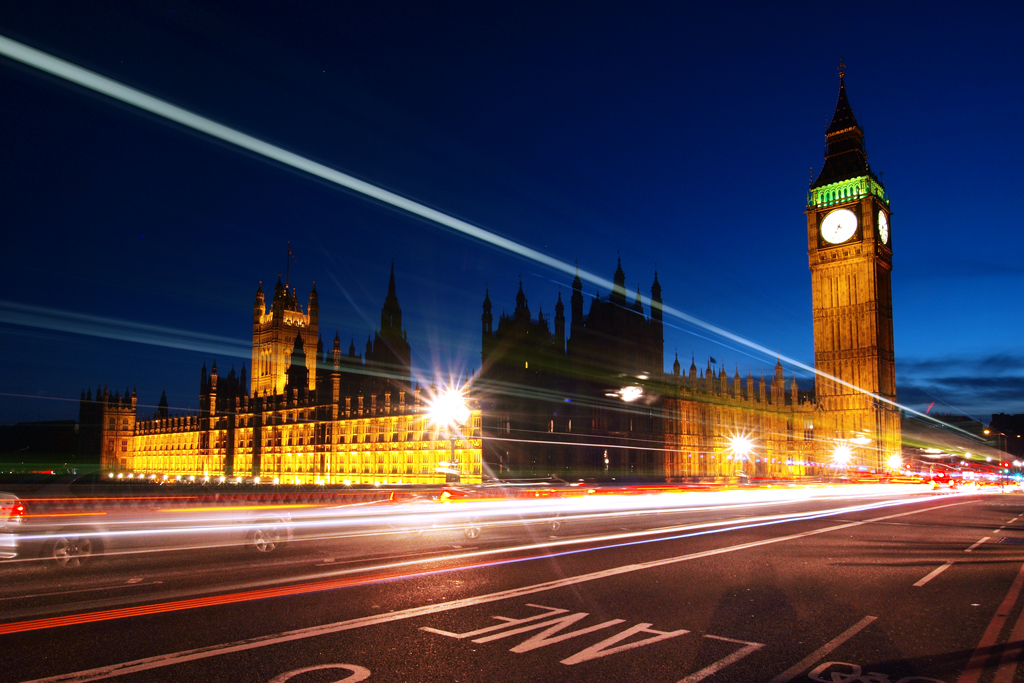
The UK system of parliamentary democracy ensures that the executive, and the prime minister, is removable by a simple majority vote in the House of Commons. The executive is bound to the rule of law, interpreted by the judiciary, but the judiciary may not declare an Act of Parliament to be unconstitutional.

While principles may be the basis of the UK constitution, the institutions of the state perform its functions in practice. First, Parliament is the sovereign entity. Its two chambers legislate. In the House of Commons each Member of Parliament is elected by a simple plurality in a democratic vote, although outcomes do not always accurately match people's preferences overall. Elections must be held within five years after the previous election of a Parliament, though historically they have tended to occur every four years. Election spending is tightly controlled, foreign interference is prohibited, and donations and lobbying are limited in whatever form. The House of Lords reviews and votes upon legislative proposals by the Commons. It can delay legislation by one year, and cannot delay at all if the proposed Act concerns money.

Most Lords are appointed by the Prime Minister, through the King, on the advice of a Commission which, by convention, offers some balance between political parties. Ninety-two hereditary peers remain. To become law, each Act of Parliament must be read by both houses three times, and given royal assent by the monarch. The Sovereign does not veto legislation, by convention, since 1708. Second, the judiciary interprets the law. It can not strike down an Act of Parliament, but the judiciary ensures that any law which may violate fundamental rights has to be clearly expressed, to force politicians to openly confront what they are doing and "accept the political cost".

Under the Constitutional Reform Act 2005, the judiciary is appointed by the Judicial Appointments Commission with cross-party and judicial recommendations, to protect judicial independence. Third, the executive branch of government is led by the prime minister who must be able to command a majority in the House of Commons. The Cabinet of Ministers is appointed by the prime minister to lead the main departments of state, such as the Treasury, the Foreign Office, the Department of Health and the Department for Education. Officially the "head of state" is the monarch, but all prerogative power is exercised by the Prime Minister, subject to judicial review. Fourth, as the UK matured as a modern democracy, an extensive system of civil servants, and public service institutions developed to deliver UK residents economic, social and legal rights. All public bodies, and private bodies that perform public functions, are bound by the rule of law.

=== Parliament ===
In the British constitution, Parliament sits at the apex of power. It emerged through a series of revolutions as the dominant body, over the church, courts, and the monarch, and within Parliament the House of Commons emerged as the dominant chamber, over the House of Lords that traditionally represented the aristocracy. The central justification for Parliamentary sovereignty is usually thought to be its democratic nature, although it was only upon the Representation of the People (Equal Franchise) Act 1928 that Parliament could be said to have finally become "democratic" in any modern sense (as property qualifications to vote were abolished for everyone over 21). Parliament's main functions are to legislate, to allocate money for public spending, and to scrutinise the government.

In practice many MPs are involved in Parliamentary committees which investigate spending, policies, laws and their impact, and often report to recommend reform. For instance, the Modernisation Committee of the House of Commons in 2002 recommended publishing draft bills before they became law, and was later found to have been highly successful. There are 650 Members of Parliament (MPs) in the House of Commons, currently elected for terms of up to five years, and 790 peers in the House of Lords. For a proposed Bill to become an Act, and law, it must be read three times in each chamber, and given royal assent by the monarch.

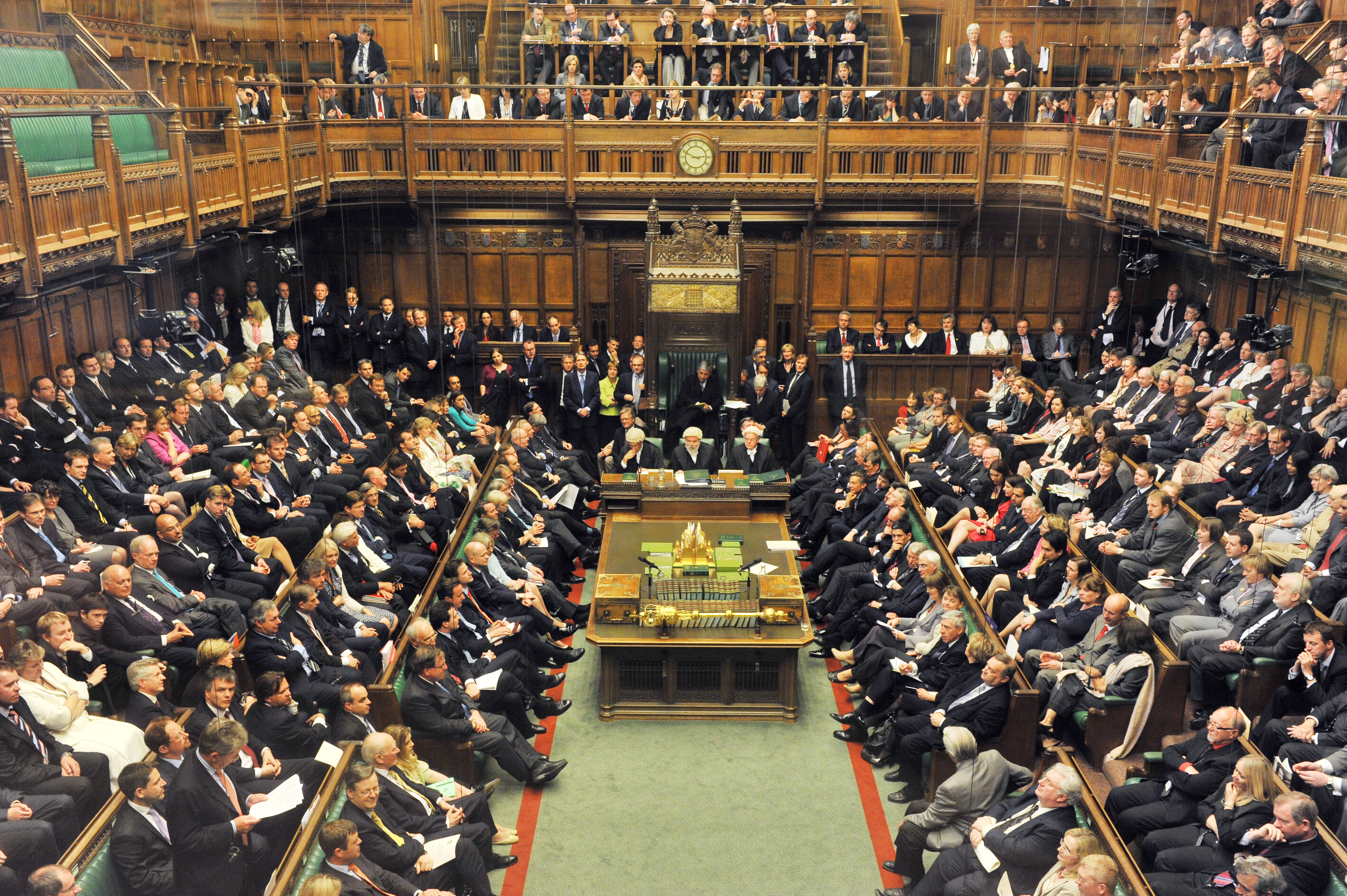
The House of Commons is the most important body in the British constitution. Its Members of Parliament are democratically elected by constituencies across the UK, and the parties who have a majority in the Commons form the British government.

Today, the House of Commons is the primary organ of representative government. Section 1 of the Representation of the People Act 1983 gives the right to all registered citizens of the United Kingdom, the Republic of Ireland and the Commonwealth aged 18 and over to elect Members of Parliament to the House of Commons. Sections 3 and 4 exclude people who are convicted of an offence and in a penal institution, or detained under mental health laws. These restrictions fall below European standards, which require that people who are convicted of very minor crimes (such as petty theft or drug offences) have the right to vote. Since 2013, everyone has to register individually to vote, instead of households being able to register collectively, but an annual household canvass is conducted to increase the number of registered people.

As far back as 1703, Ashby v White recognised the right to "vote at the election of a person to represent him or [her] in Parliament, there to concur to the making of laws, which are to bind his liberty and property" as "a most transcendent thing, and of an high nature". This originally meant that any interference in that right would lead to damages. If the denial of voting would have changed the result, or if a vote was "conducted so badly that it was not substantially in accordance with the law" the vote would have to be run again. So, in Morgan v Simpson the Court of Appeal declared that an election for a Greater London Council seat was not valid after it was found that 44 unstamped ballot papers were not counted. These common law principles predate statutory regulation, and therefore appear to apply to any vote, including elections and referendums.

Election spending is tightly controlled today by statute. A maximum of £20 million can be spent by political parties in national campaigns, plus £10,000 in each constituency. Political advertisements on television are prohibited except for those in certain free time slots, although the internet remains largely unregulated. Any spending over £500 by third parties must be disclosed. While these rules are strict, they were held in Animal Defenders International v UK to be compatible with the Convention because "each person has equal value" and "we do not want our government or its policies to be decided by the highest spenders." Foreign interference in voting is completely prohibited, including any "broadcasting" (also over the internet) "with intent to influence persons to give or refrain from giving their votes".

Donations by foreign parties can be forfeited in their entirety to the Electoral Commission. Domestic donations are limited to registered parties, and must be reported, when they are over £7,500 nationally or £1,500 locally, to the Electoral Commission. The system for electing the Commons is based on constituencies, whose boundaries are periodically reviewed to even out populations. There has been considerable debate about the first-past-the-post system of voting the UK uses, as it tends to exclude minority parties. By contrast, in Australia voters may select preferences for candidates, although this system was rejected in a 2011 United Kingdom Alternative Vote referendum staged by the Cameron-Clegg coalition. In the European Parliament, voters choose a party from multi-member regional constituencies: this tends to give smaller parties much greater representation. In the Scottish Parliament, the Welsh Parliament and London Assembly, voters have the choice of both constituencies and a party list, which tends to reflect overall preferences best. To be elected as an MP, most people generally become members of political parties, and must be over 18 on the day of nomination to run for a seat, be a qualifying Commonwealth or Irish citizen, not be bankrupt, found guilty of corrupt practices, or be a Lord, judge or employee of the civil service. To limit the government's practical control over Parliament, the Ministerial and other Salaries Act 1975 restricts higher payment of salaries to a set number of MPs.

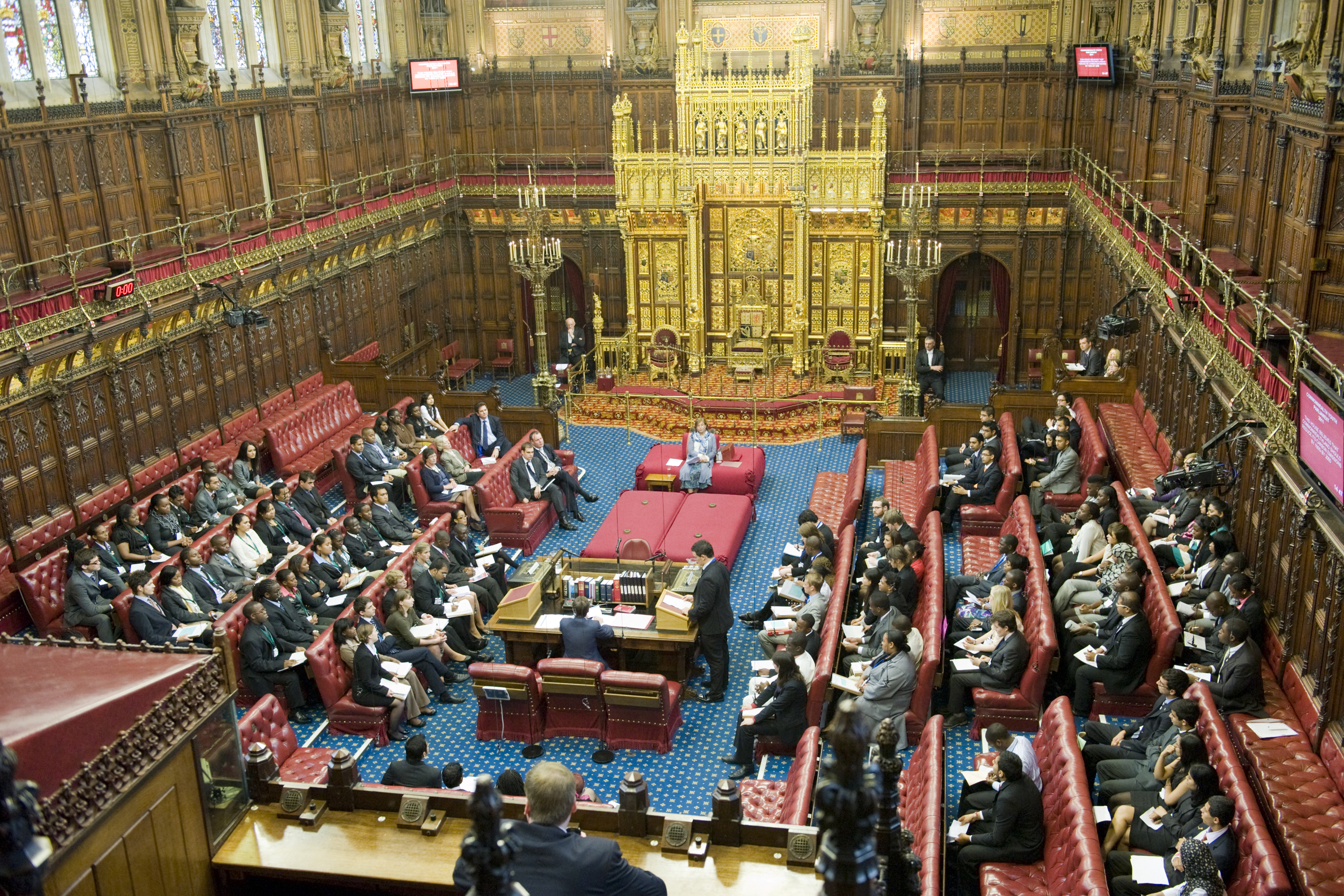
The House of Lords is a chamber mostly appointed by the prime minister, loosely based on the Lords' expertise, achievement, or political affiliation. Since the abolition of most hereditary peers, there has been ongoing debate about whether or how to elect the House of Lords.

Along with a hereditary monarch, the House of Lords remains an historical curiosity in the British constitution. Traditionally it represented the landed aristocracy, and political allies of the monarch or the government, and has only gradually and incompletely been reformed. Today, the House of Lords Act 1999 has abolished all but 92 hereditary peers, leaving most peers to be "life peers" appointed by the government under the Life Peerages Act 1958, law lords appointed under the Appellate Jurisdiction Act 1876, and Lords Spiritual who are senior clergy of the Church of England. Since 2005, senior judges can only sit and vote in the House of Lords after retirement.

The government carries out appointment of most peers, but since 2000 has taken advice from a seven-person House of Lords Appointments Commission with representatives from the Labour, Conservatives and Liberal-Democrat parties. A peerage can always be disclaimed, and ex-peers may then run for Parliament. Since 2015, a peer may be suspended or expelled by the House. In practice the Parliament Act 1949 greatly reduced the House of Lords' power, as it can only delay and cannot block legislation by one year, and cannot delay money bills at all.

Several options for reform have been debated. A House of Lords Reform Bill 2012 proposed to have 360 directly elected members, 90 appointed members, 12 bishops and an uncertain number of ministerial members. The elected Lords would have been elected by proportional representation for 15-year terms, through 10 regional constituencies on a single transferable vote system. However, the government withdrew support after backlash from Conservative backbenches. It has often been argued that if the Lords were elected by geographic constituencies and a party controlled both sides "there would be little prospect of effective scrutiny or revision of government business."

A second option, like in the Swedish Riksdag, could simply be to abolish the House of Lords. This was done during the English Civil War in 1649, but restored along with the monarchy in 1660. A third proposed option is to elect peers by work and professional groups, so that health care workers elect peers with special health knowledge, people in education elect a fixed number of education experts, legal professionals elect legal representatives, and so on. This is argued to be necessary to improve the quality of legislation.

=== Judiciary ===
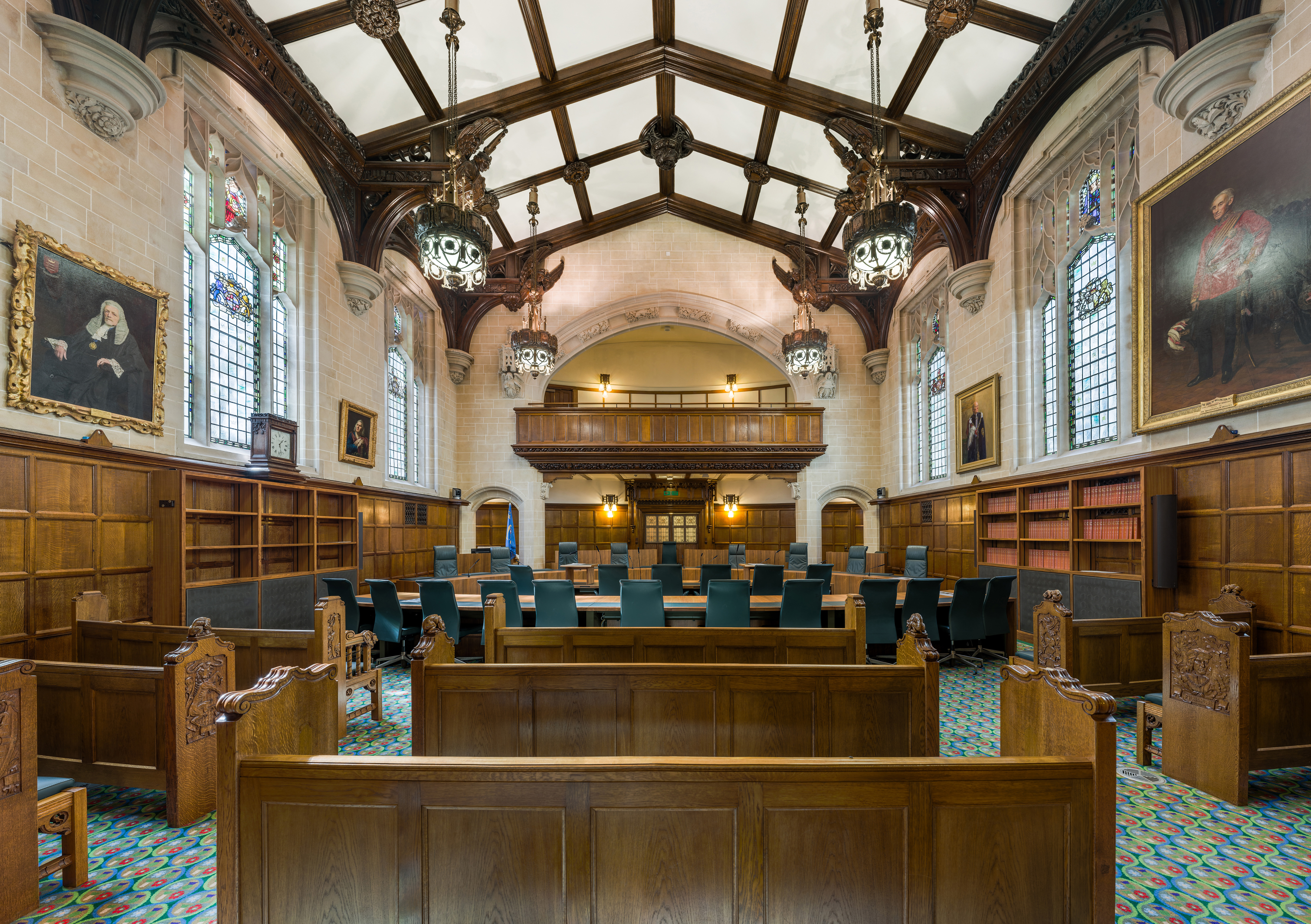
Proceedings in the UK Supreme Court, which moved to its modern home at Middlesex Guildhall in 2009, are web-streamed live.

Due to the history of the United Kingdom, there are three jurisdictions: England and Wales (formally known as 'England' prior to the Welsh Language Act 1967), Scotland, and Northern Ireland, that follow distinct legal systems of English law, Scots law, and Northern Ireland law.

The judiciary in the United Kingdom has the essential functions of upholding the rule of law, democracy, and human rights. The highest court of appeal, renamed from the House of Lords officially from 2005, is the Supreme Court. The Lord Chancellor's role changed dramatically on 3 April 2006, as a result of the Constitutional Reform Act 2005. Due to the Constitutional Reform Act of 2005, the make up of the Judiciary is clearly demonstrated for the first time inside the Constitution. This form of enshrined law presents a new branch of government. An independent Supreme Court has been established, separate from the House of Lords and with its own independent appointments system, staff, budget and building.

Further aspects of this explores how independent the Judiciary has become. An Appointments Commission, responsible for selecting candidates to recommend for judicial appointment to the secretary of state for justice was established. The Judicial Appointments Commission ensures that merit remains the sole criterion for appointment and the appointments system is modern, open and transparent. In terms of scrutiny, A Judicial Appointment and Conduct Ombudsman, responsible for investigating and making recommendations concerning complaints about the judicial appointments process, and the handling of judicial conduct complaints within the scope of the Constitutional Reform Act, provides checks and balances to the Supreme Court.

The Judiciary hears appeals from the whole UK in civil law matters, and for criminal law in England and Wales, and Northern Ireland. It does not hear criminal appeals from Scotland. The Supreme Court does however consider "devolution issues" where these may affect Scottish criminal law. Since the 1966 Practice Statement, the judiciary has acknowledged that while a system of precedent, that binds lower courts, is necessary to provide "at least some degree of certainty", the courts should update their jurisprudence and "depart from a previous decision when it appears right to do so."

Litigation usually begins in a County Court or the High Court for civil law issues, or a magistrates' court or the Crown Court for criminal law issues. There are also employment tribunals for labour law disputes, and the First-tier Tribunal for public or regulatory disputes, ranging from immigration, to social security, to tax. After the High Court, Crown Court, or appeal tribunals, cases generally may appeal to the Court of Appeal in England and Wales. In Scotland, the Court of Session has an Outer (first instance) and Inner (appeal) House. Appeals then go to the Supreme Court. Since the Human Rights Act 1998, courts have been expressly required to interpret law to be compatible with the European Convention on Human Rights. This follows a longer tradition of courts interpreting the law to be compatible with international law obligations.

It is generally accepted that the British courts do not merely apply but also create new law through their interpretative function: this is obvious in the common law and equity, where there is no codified statutory basis for large parts of the law, such as contracts, torts or trusts. This also means an element of retroactivity, since an application of developing rules may differ from at least one party's understanding of the law in any conflict. Although formally the British judiciary may not declare an Act of Parliament "unconstitutional", in practice the judiciary's power to interpret the law so as to be compatible with human rights can render a statute inoperative, much like in other countries. The courts do so sparingly because they recognise the importance of the democratic process. Judges may also sit from time to time on public inquiries.

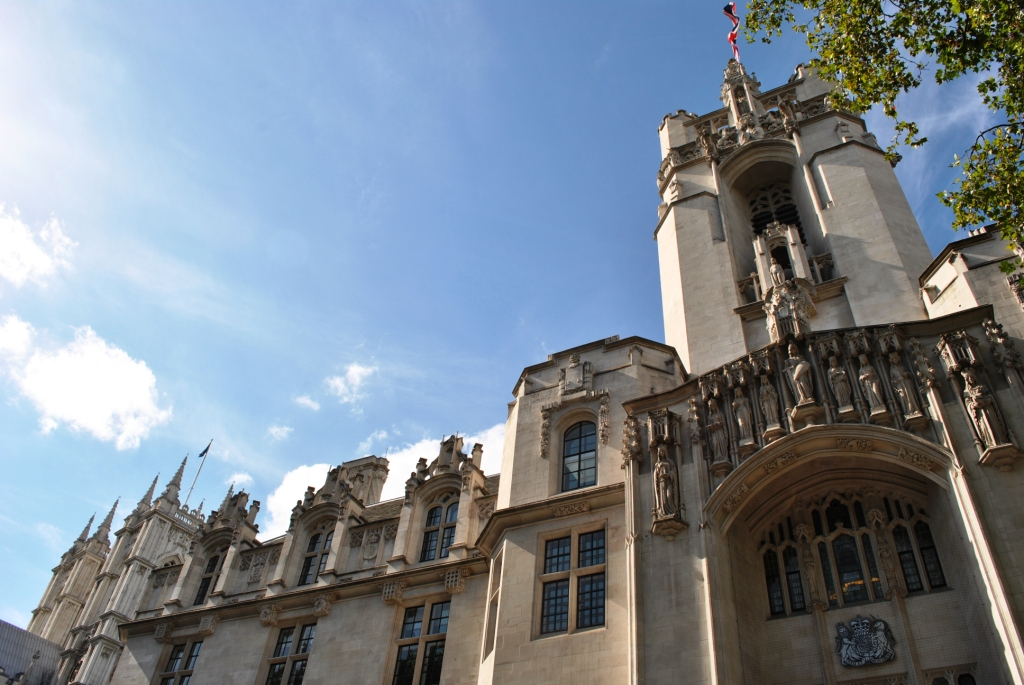
The Supreme Court on Parliament Square, London

The independence of the judiciary is one of the cornerstones of the constitution, and means in practice that judges cannot be dismissed from office. Since the Act of Settlement 1700, no judge has been removed, as to do so the King must act on address by both Houses of Parliament. It is very likely that a judge would never be dismissed, not merely because of formal rules but a "shared constitutional understanding" of the importance of the integrity of the legal system. This is reflected, for example, in the sub judice rule that matters awaiting decision in court should not be prejudged in a Parliamentary debate. The Lord Chancellor, once head of the judiciary but now simply a government minister, also has a statutory duty to uphold the independence of the judiciary, for instance, against attacks upon their integrity by media, corporations, or the government itself.

Members of the judiciary can be appointed from among any member of the legal profession who has over 10 years of experience having rights of audience before a court: this usually includes barristers, but can also mean solicitors or academics. Appointments should be made "solely on merit" but regard may be had to the need for diversity when two candidates have equal qualifications. For appointments to the Supreme Court, a five-member Judicial Appointments Committee is formed including one Supreme Court judge, three members from the Judicial Appointments Commission, and one lay person. For other senior judges such as those on the Court of Appeal, or for the Lord Chief Justice, Master of the Rolls, or the heads of the High Court divisions, a similar five member panel with two judges is formed. Gender and ethnic diversity is lacking in the British judiciary compared to other developed countries, and potentially compromises the expertise and administration of justice.

Backing up the judiciary is a considerable body of administrative law. The Contempt of Court Act 1981 enables a court to hold anyone in contempt, and commit the person to imprisonment, for violating a court order, or behaviour that could compromise a fair judicial process. In practice this is enforced by the executive. The Lord Chancellor heads the Ministry of Justice, which performs various functions including administering the Legal Aid Agency for people who cannot afford access to the courts. In R (UNISON) v Lord Chancellor the government suffered scathing criticism for creating high fees that cut the number of applicants to employment tribunals by 70 per cent. The attorney general of England and Wales, and in Scottish matters, the advocate general for Scotland, and the solicitor general for England and Wales represent the Crown in litigation. The attorney general also appoints the director of public prosecutions, who heads the Crown Prosecution Service, which reviews cases submitted by the police for prosecution, and conducts them on behalf of the Crown.

=== Executive ===
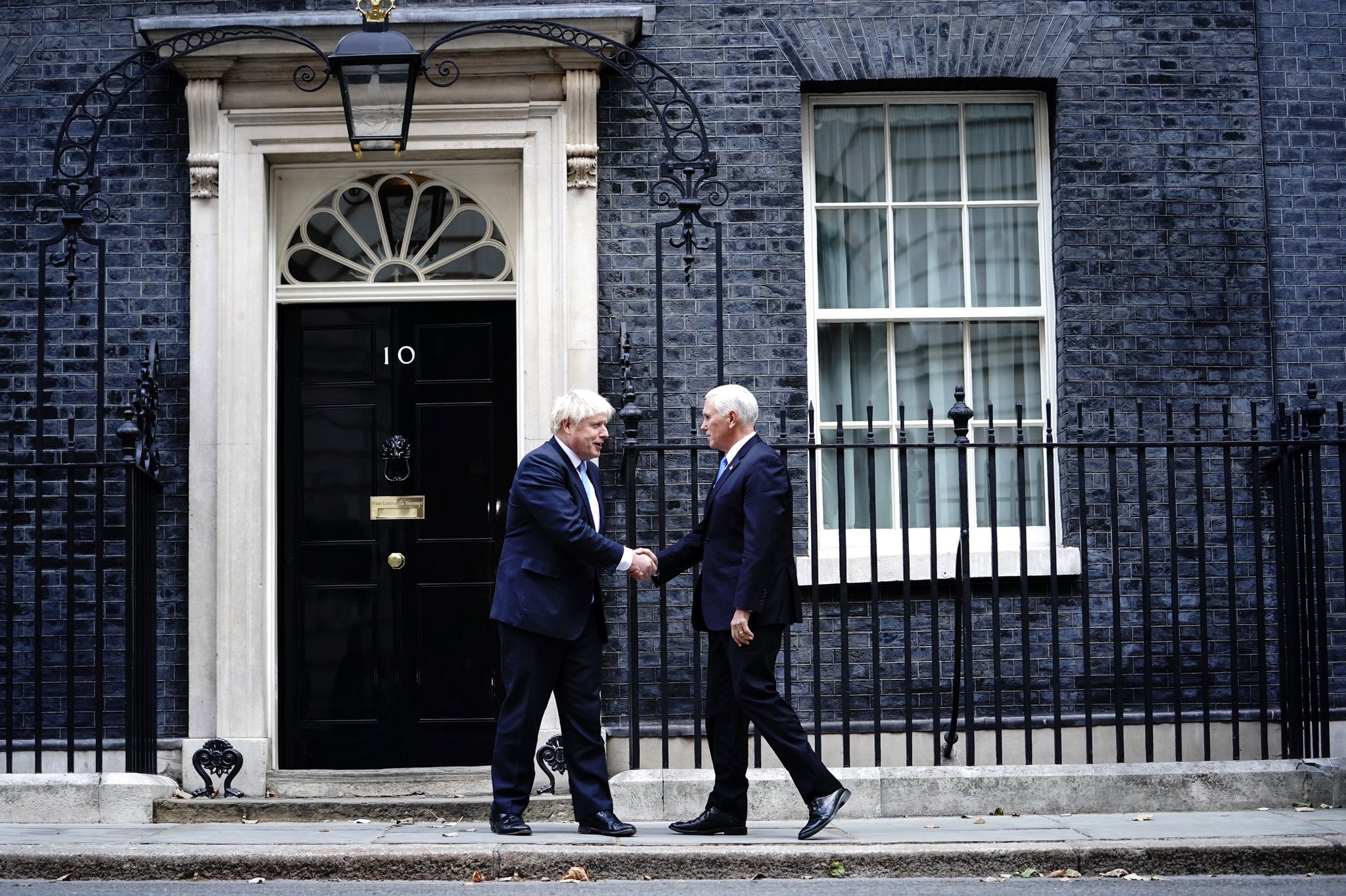
The prime minister, at 10 Downing Street, exercises political power of the British government, when they command majority support of the House of Commons.

The executive branch, while subservient to Parliament and judicial oversight, exercises day to day power of the British government. The UK remains a constitutional monarchy. The formal head of state is Charles III, the monarch since 2022. No Queen or King has withheld assent to any bill passed by Parliament since 1708, and all constitutional duties and power are accepted by binding convention to have shifted to the prime minister, Parliament or the courts. Over the 17th century, the Petition of Right was asserted by Parliament to prevent any taxation by the monarch without Parliament's consent, and the Habeas Corpus Act 1640 denied the monarch any power to arrest people for failing to pay taxes.

The monarch's continued assertion of the divine right to rule led to Charles I being executed in the English Civil War, and finally the settlement of power in the Bill of Rights 1689. Following the Act of Union 1707 and an early financial crisis as South Sea Company shares crashed, Robert Walpole emerged as a dominant political figure. Leading the House of Commons from 1721 to 1742, Walpole is generally acknowledged to be the first prime minister (Primus inter pares). The PM's modern functions include leading the dominant political party, setting policy priorities, creating Ministries and appointing ministers, judges, peers, and civil servants. The PM also has considerable control through the convention of collective responsibility (that ministers must publicly support the government even when they privately disagree, or resign), and control over the government's communications to the public.

By contrast in law, as is necessary in a democratic society, the monarch is a figurehead with no political power, but a series of ceremonial duties, and considerable funding. Aside from private wealth and finance, the monarchy is funded under the Sovereign Grant Act 2011, which reserves 25 per cent of the net revenue from the Crown Estate. The Crown Estate is a public, government corporation, which in 2015 held £12 billion in investments, mostly land and property, and therefore generates income by charging rent to businesses or people for homes. The monarch's major ceremonial duties are to appoint the prime minister who can command the majority of the House of Commons, to give royal assent to Acts of Parliament, and to dissolve Parliament upon the calling of an election.

Minor ceremonial duties include giving an audience to the Prime Minister, as well as visiting ministers or diplomats from the Commonwealth, and acting on state occasions, such as delivering the "King's speech" (written by the government, outlining its political platform) at the opening of Parliament. Public support for the monarchy remains high, with only 21% of the population preferring a republic instead. However, on the other hand, it has been argued that the UK should abolish the monarchy, on the ground that hereditary inheritance of political office has no place in a modern democracy. A referendum was held in Australia, in 1999 on becoming a Republic, but failed to get a majority.

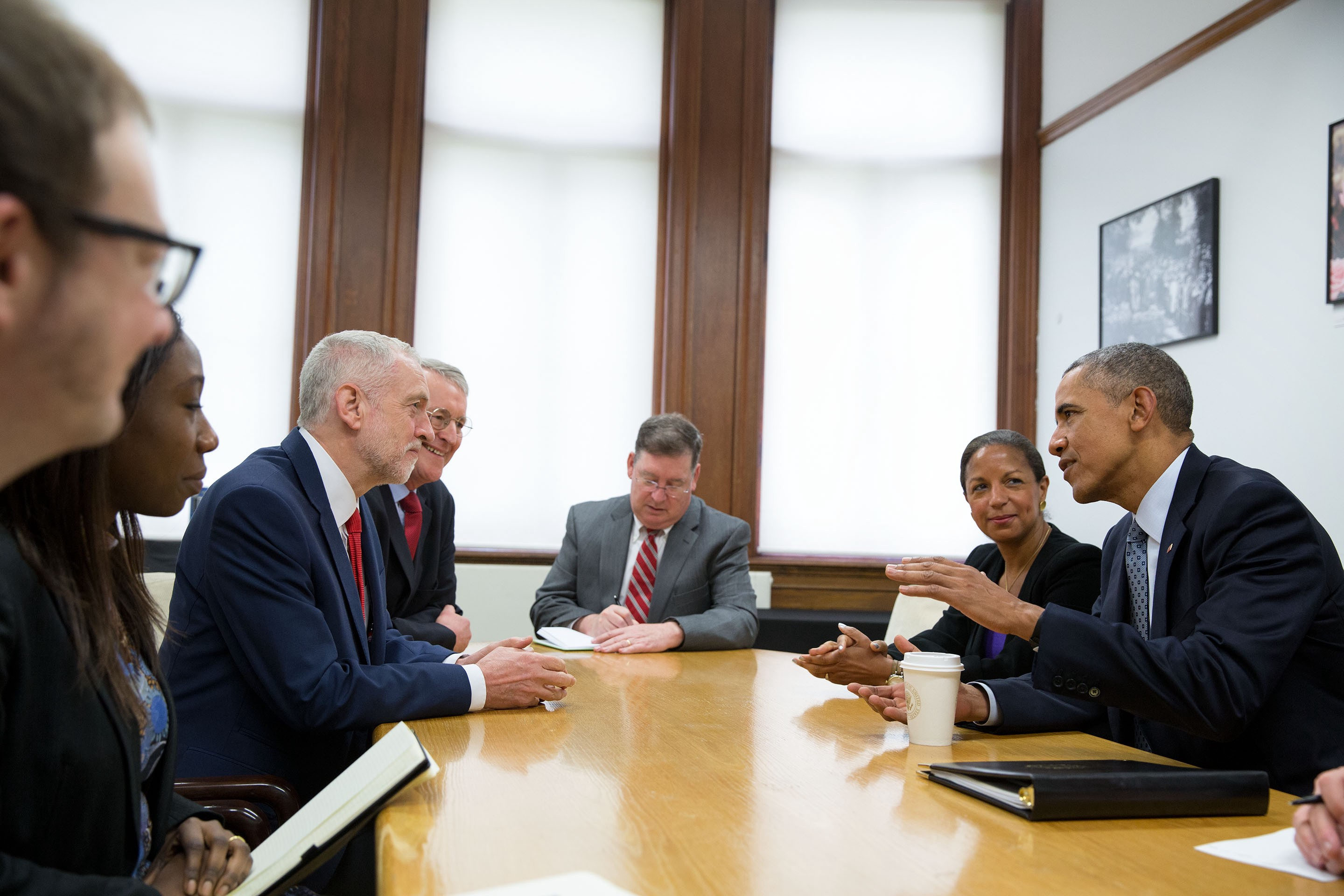
US President Barack Obama (R) meeting with Opposition leader Jeremy Corbyn (L): The task of the official opposition, currently led by Kemi Badenoch of the Conservative Party, is to hold the government and the Prime Minister to account in and out of Parliament.

Although called the royal prerogative, a series of important powers that were once vested in the king or queen are now exercised by government, and the prime minister in particular. These are powers of day-to-day management, but tightly constrained to ensure that executive power cannot usurp Parliament or the courts. In the Case of Prohibitions in 1607, it was held that the royal prerogative could not be used to determine court cases, and in the Case of Proclamations in 1610 it was held new prerogative powers could not be created by the executive.

It is also clear that no exercise of the prerogative can compromise any right contained in an Act of Parliament. So, for instance, in R (Miller) v Secretary of State for Exiting the European Union the Supreme Court held that the prime minister could not notify the European Commission of an intention to leave under Article 50 of the Treaty on European Union without an Act of Parliament, because it could result in rights being withdrawn that were granted under the European Communities Act 1972, such as the right to work in other EU member states or vote in European Parliament elections.

Though royal prerogative powers can be categorised in different ways, there are around 15. First, the executive may create hereditary titles, confer honours and create peers. Second, the executive can legislate by an Order in Council, though this has been called an 'anachronistic survival'. Third, the executive can create and administer financial benefits schemes. Fourth, through the attorney general the executive can stop prosecutions or pardon convicted offenders after taking advice. Fifth, the executive may acquire more territory or alter limits of British territorial waters. Sixth, the executive may expel aliens and theoretically restrain people from leaving the UK. Seventh, the executive can sign treaties, although before it is considered ratified the treaty must be laid before Parliament for 21 days and there must be no resolution against it. Eighth, the executive governs the armed forces and can do "all those things in an emergency which are necessary for the conduct of war".

The executive cannot declare war without Parliament by convention, and in any case has no hope in funding war without Parliament. Ninth, the Prime Minister can appoint ministers, judges, public officials or royal commissioners. Tenth, the monarch needs to pay no tax, unless statute states it expressly. Eleventh, the executive may by royal charter create corporations, such as the BBC, and franchises for markets, ferries and fisheries. Twelfth, the executive has the right to mine precious metals, and to take treasure troves. Thirteenth, it may make coins. Fourteenth, it can print or licence the authorised version of the Bible, Book of Common Prayer and state papers. And fifteenth, subject to modern family law, it may take guardianship of infants.

In addition to these royal prerogative powers, there are innumerable powers explicitly laid down in statutes enabling the executive to make legal changes. This includes a growing number of Henry VIII clauses, which enable a Secretary of State to alter provisions of primary legislation. For this reason it has often been argued that executive authority should be reduced, written into statute, and never used to deprive people of rights without Parliament. All uses of the prerogative, however, are subject to judicial review: in the GCHQ case the House of Lords held that no person could be deprived of legitimate expectations by use of the royal prerogative.

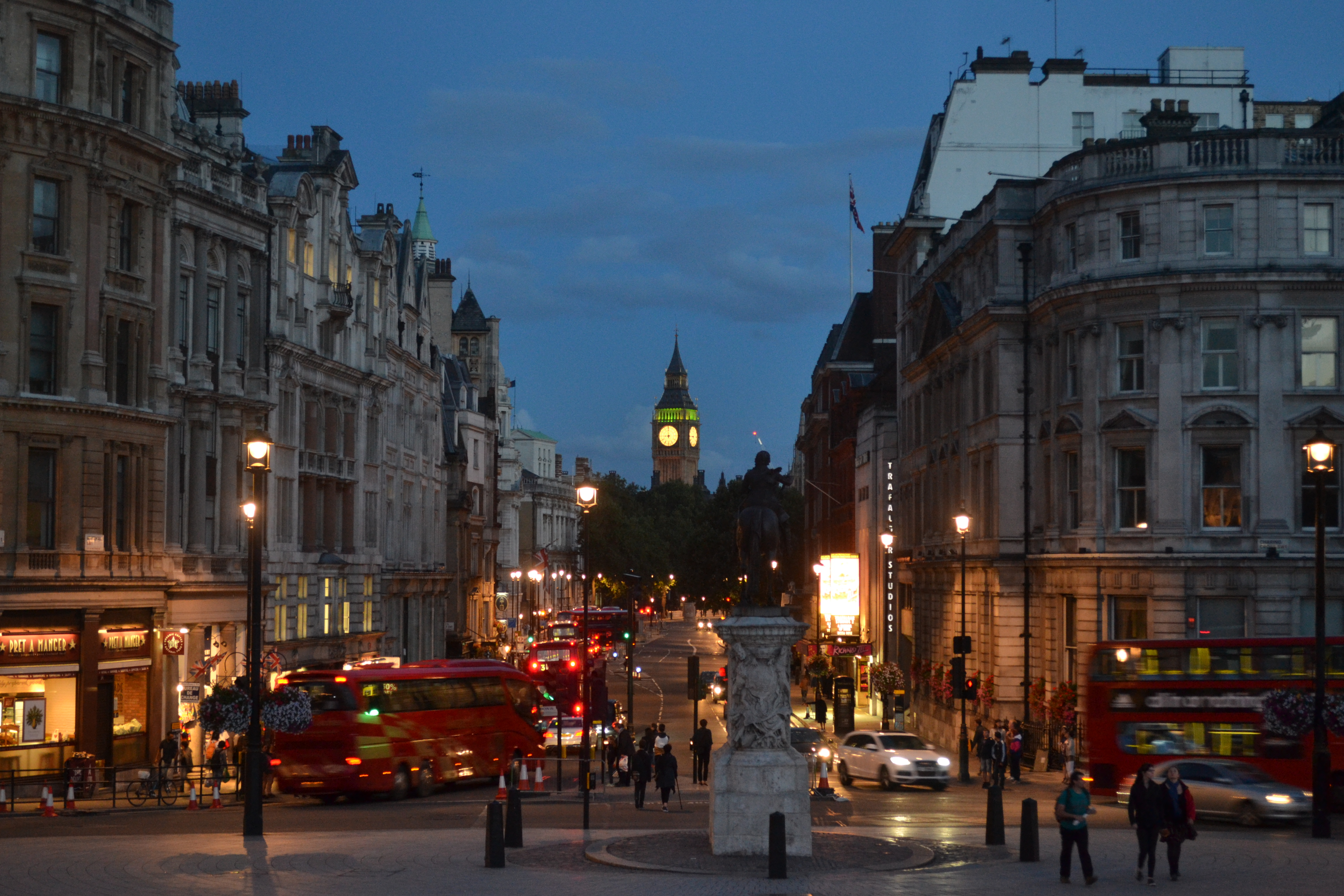
Whitehall hosts the major offices of the British government, led by cabinet ministers. Facing towards Big Ben is a statue of Charles I, who was executed in 1649 following the English Civil War.

Although the Prime Minister is the head of Parliament, His Majesty's Government is formed by a larger group of Members of Parliament, or peers. The "cabinet" is a still smaller group of 22 or 23 people, though only twenty ministers may be paid. Each minister typically heads a Department or Ministry, which can be created or renamed by prerogative. Cabinet committees are usually organised by the Prime Minister. Every minister is expected to follow collective responsibility, and the Ministerial Code 2010. This includes rules that Ministers are "expected to behave in a way that upholds the highest standards of propriety", "give accurate and truthful information to Parliament", resign if they "knowingly mislead Parliament", to be "as open as possible", have no possible conflicts of interest and give a full list of interests to a permanent secretary, and only "remain in office for so long as they retain the confidence of the Prime Minister".

Assisting ministers is a modern civil service and network of government bodies, who are employed at the pleasure of the Crown. The Civil Service Code requires civil servants to show "high standards of behaviour", uphold core values of "integrity, honesty, objectivity and impartiality", and never put themselves in a position that "might reasonably be seen to compromise their personal judgment or integrity". Since the Freedom of Information Act 2000, it has been expected that government should be open about information, and should disclose it upon a request unless disclosure would compromise personal data, security or may run against the public interest. In this way the trend has been to more open, transparent and accountable governance.

=== Local government ===
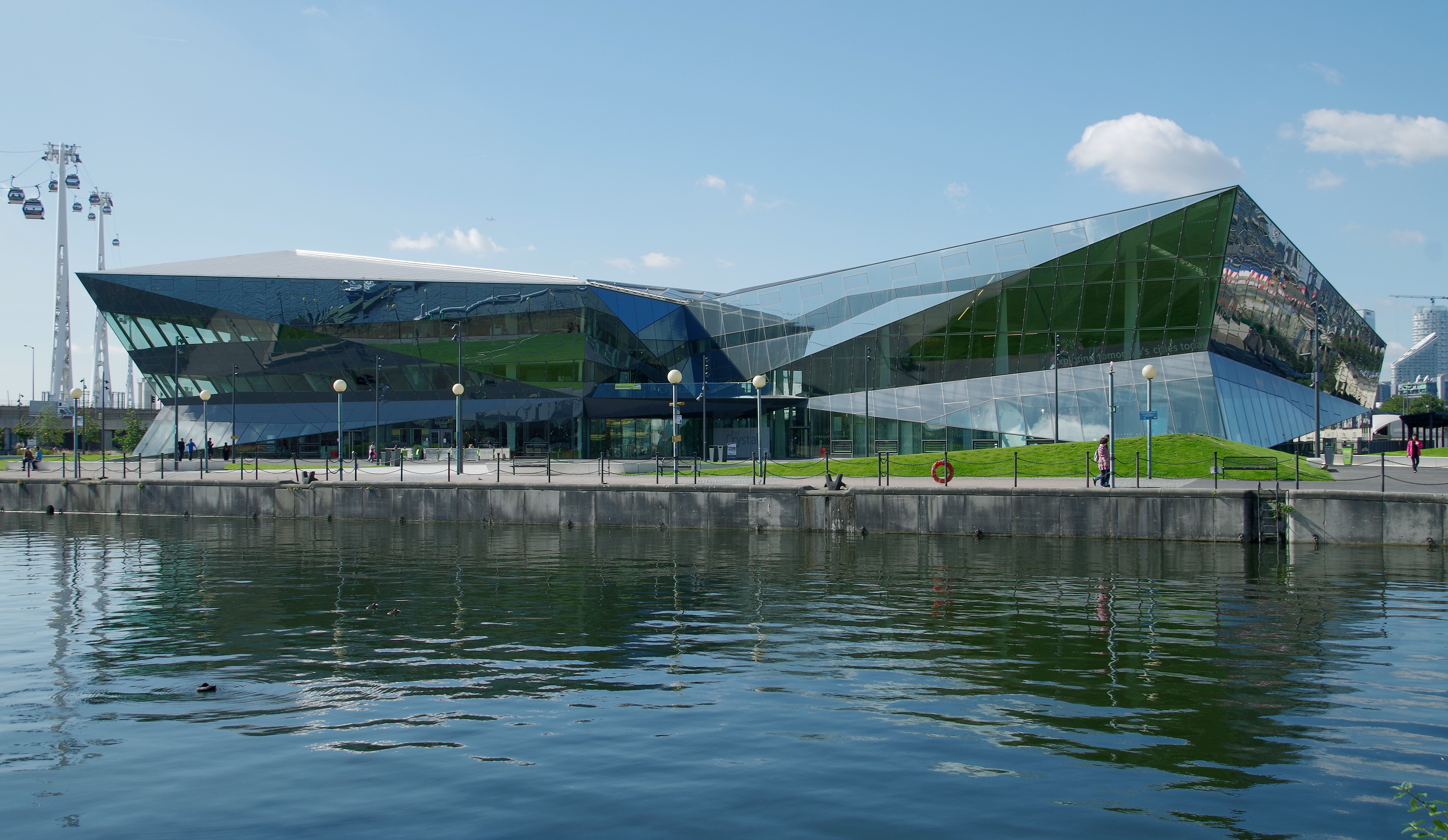
The London Assembly and Mayor of London work at City Hall. The only region of England with representation, it has limited powers including over transport, the environment and housing.

The constitution of British regional governments is an uncodified patchwork of authorities, mayors, councils and devolved government. In Wales, Scotland, Northern Ireland and London unified district or borough councils have local government powers, and since 1998 to 2006 new regional assemblies or Parliaments exercise extra powers devolved from Westminster. In England, there are 55 unitary authorities in the larger towns (e.g. Bristol, Brighton, Milton Keynes) and 36 metropolitan boroughs (surrounding Liverpool, Manchester, Leeds, Birmingham, Sheffield, and Newcastle) which function as unitary local authorities.

In other parts of England, local government is split between two tiers of authority: 32 larger County Councils, and within those 192 District Councils, each sharing different functions. Since 1994, England has had eight regions for administrative purposes at Whitehall, yet these have no regional government or democratic assembly (like in London, Scotland, Wales or Northern Ireland) after a 2004 referendum on North East Assembly failed. This means that England has among the most centralised, and disunified systems of governance in the Commonwealth and Europe.

Three main issues in local government are the authorities' financing, their powers, and the reform of governance structures. First, councils raise revenue from Council Tax (charged on local residents according to property values in 1993) and business rates charged on businesses with operations in the locality. These powers are, compared to other countries, extreme in limiting local government autonomy, and taxes can be subjected to a local referendum if the secretary of state determines they are excessive.

In real terms since 2010, central government cut local council funding by nearly 50 per cent, and real spending fell by 21 per cent, as councils failed to make up cuts through business rates. Unitary authorities and district councils are responsible for administering council tax and business rates. The duties of British local governments are also extremely limited compared to other countries, but also uncodified so that in 2011 the Department for Communities and Local Government enumerated 1340 specific duties of local authorities. Generally, the Localism Act 2011 section 1 states local authorities may do anything an individual person may do, unless prohibited by law, but this provision has little effect because human beings or companies cannot tax or regulate other people in the way that governments must.

The Local Government Act 1972 section 101 says that a local authority can discharge its functions through a committee or any officer, and can transfer functions to another authority, while section 111 gives authorities the power to do anything including spending or borrowing 'which is calculated to facilitate, or is conducive or incidental to, the discharge of any of their functions'. However, the real duties of local council are found in hundreds of scattered Acts and statutory instruments. These include duties to administer planning consent, to carry out compulsory purchasing according to law, to administer school education, libraries, care for children, roads or highway maintenance and local buses, provide care for the elderly and disabled, prevent pollution and ensure clean air, ensure collection, recycling and disposal of waste, regulate building standards, provide social and affordable housing, and shelters for the homeless.

Local authorities do not yet have powers common in other countries, such as setting minimum wages, regulating rents, or borrowing and taxing as is necessary in the public interest, which frustrates objectives of pluralism, localism and autonomy. Since 2009, authorities have been empowered to merge into 'combined authorities' and to have an elected mayor, though not all combined authorities have directly elected mayors. This has been done around Manchester, Sheffield, Liverpool, Newcastle, Leeds, Birmingham, the Tees Valley, Bristol and Peterborough. The functions of an elected mayor are not substantial, but can include those of Police and Crime Commissioners.

Combined authorities are created through a proposal system, wherein the Department for Local Government, Housing and Communities collaborates with existing local authorities to cater the prospective combined authorities to the needs and wishes of areas in question. This process may also require the reorganisation of existing local authorities, as in the present case of the Lancashire County Combined Authority, which, if not reorganised, would be formed of 14 local authorities, including district councils such as Chorley Council and unitary authorities such as Blackpool Council. Proposals are brought forward by existing local authorities, with DfLGHC then making a decision on which proposal to take forward in forming the Combined Authority. Once a decision has been made by the government, local authorities may then negotiate the terms of the prospective Combined Authority through a devolution consultation, as in the case of the Cumbria Combined Authority. This consultation may include decisions about the powers and responsibilities devolved to the Combined Authority, its organisation (including whether a directly elected mayor will be a constituent member of the Authority) and how the Authority will be funded. It is the aim of the UK government to have the entirety of England represented by a Combined Authority by 2030.

=== Devolved governments ===
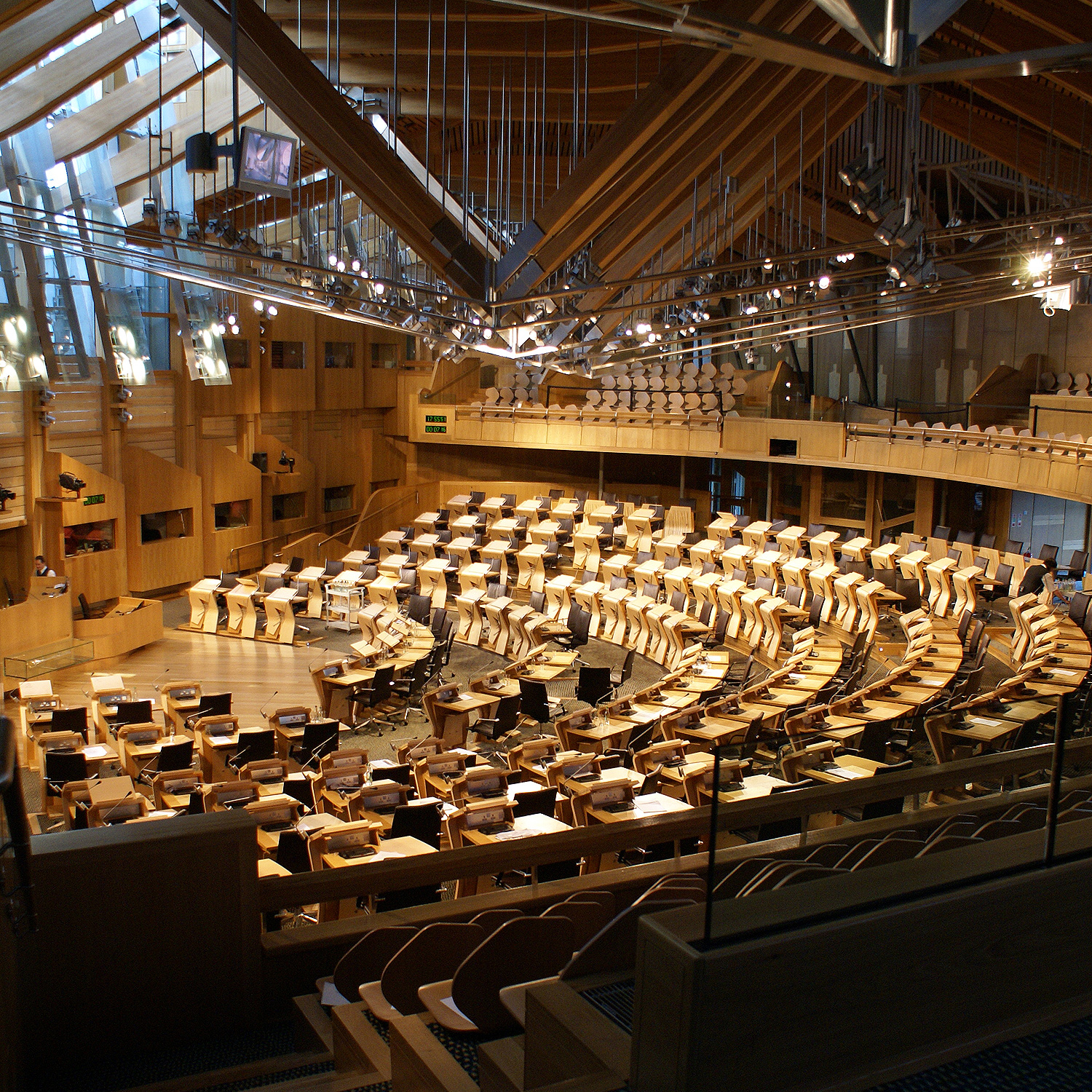
The Scottish Parliament at Holyrood has 129 MSPs with extensive powers, including taxation.

Scotland, Wales and Northern Ireland have their own devolved governments and national parliament, similar to state or provincial governments in other countries. The extent of devolution differs in each place. The Scotland Act 1998 created a unicameral Scottish Parliament with 129 elected members each four years: 73 from single member constituencies with simple majority vote, and 56 from additional member systems of proportional representation. Under section 28, the Scottish Parliament can make any laws except for on 'reserved matters' listed in Schedule 5. These powers, reserved for the British Parliament, include foreign affairs, defence, finance, economic planning, home affairs, trade and industry, social security, employment, broadcasting, and equal opportunities.

By convention, members of the British Parliament from Scottish constituencies do not vote on issues that the Scottish Parliament has exercised power over. This is the most powerful regional government so far. The Northern Ireland Act 1998 lists which matters are transferred to the Northern Ireland Assembly. The Government of Wales Act 1998 created a 60-member national assembly with elections every four years, and set out twenty fields of government competence, with some exceptions. The fields include agriculture, fisheries, forestry and rural development, economic development, education, environmental policy, health, highways and transport, housing, planning, and some aspects of social welfare. The Supreme Court has tended to interpret these powers in favour of devolution.

== Human rights ==
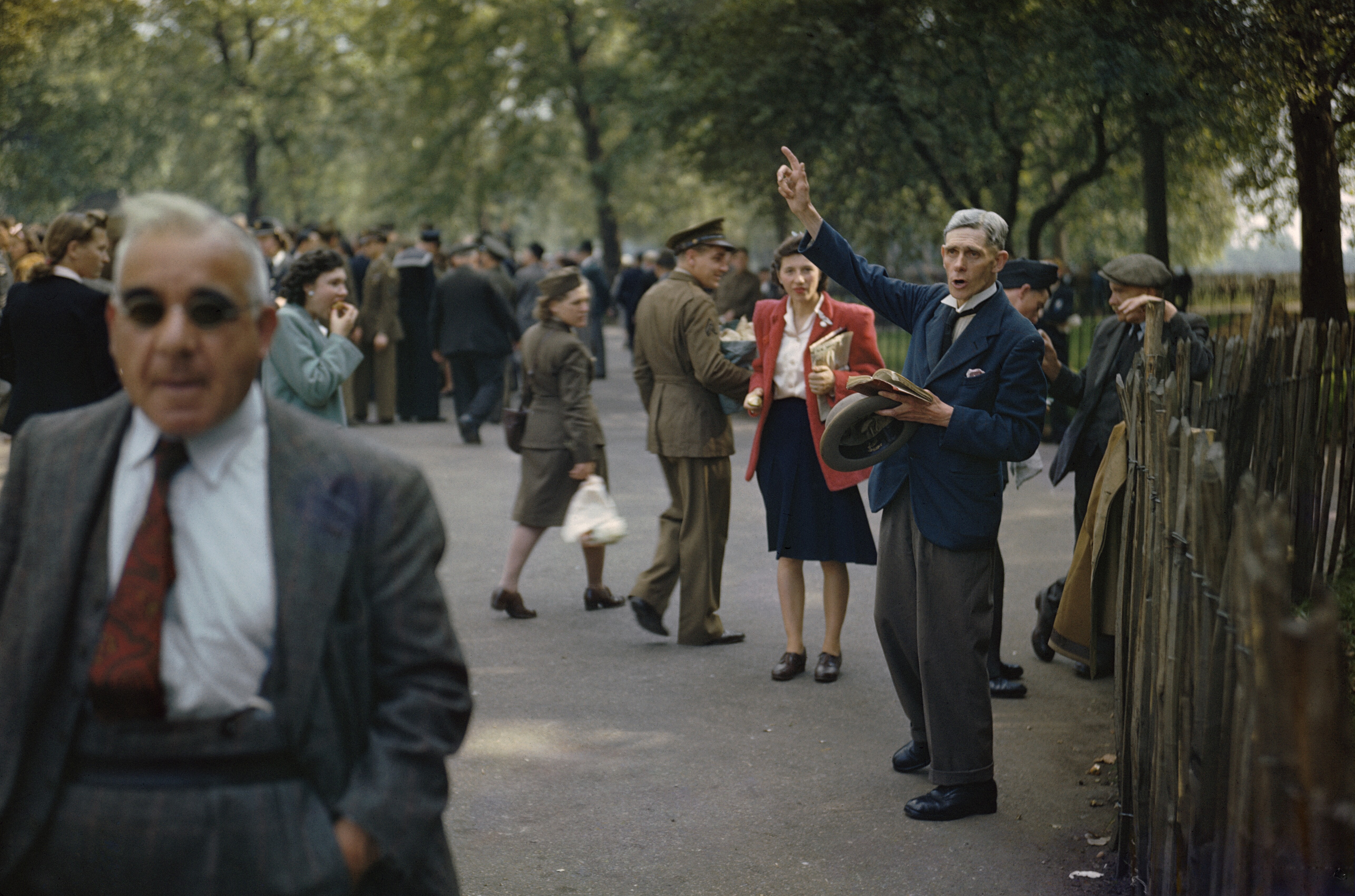
At Speakers' Corner of Hyde Park, London, the people traditionally gather to exchange views, debate, and listen. Debating and free speech societies are found throughout the UK and make a regular part of TV.

Codification of human rights is recent, but before the Human Rights Act 1998 and the European Convention on Human Rights, British law had one of the world's longest human rights traditions. Magna Carta bound the King to require Parliament's consent before any tax, respect the right to a trial "by lawful judgment of his Peers, or by the Law of the Land", stated that "We will sell to no man, we will not deny or defer to any man either Justice or Right", guaranteed free movement for people, and preserved common land for everyone.

After the English Civil War the Bill of Rights 1689 in England and Wales, and the Claim of Right Act 1689 in Scotland, enshrined principles of representative democracy, no tax without Parliament, freedom of speech in Parliament, and no "cruel and unusual punishment". By 1789, these ideas evolved and inspired both the US Bill of Rights, and the Declaration of the Rights of Man and of the Citizen after the American and French Revolutions. Although some labelled natural rights as "nonsense upon stilts", more legal rights were slowly developed by Parliament and the courts. In 1792, Mary Wollstonecraft began the British movement for women's rights and equality, while movements behind the Tolpuddle Martyrs and the Chartists drove reform for labour and democratic freedom.

Upon the catastrophe of World War II and The Holocaust, the new international law order put the Universal Declaration of Human Rights 1948 at its centre, enshrining civil, political, economic, social and cultural rights. In 1950, the UK co-authored the European Convention on Human Rights, enabling people to appeal to the European Court of Human Rights in Strasbourg even against Acts of Parliament: Parliament has always undertaken to comply with basic principles of international law.

Because this appeals process was long, Parliament legislated to "bring rights home" with the Human Rights Act 1998, so that people can raise human rights claims in British courts based on the Convention directly. The Convention contains the rights to life, rights against torture, against forced labour, to marry, to an effective remedy, and the right to suffer no discrimination in those rights. Most case law concerns the rights to liberty, privacy, freedom of conscience and freedom of expression, and to freedom of association and assembly. The UK also enshrines rights to fair labour standards, social security, and a multitude of social and economic rights through its legislation.

== Administrative law ==
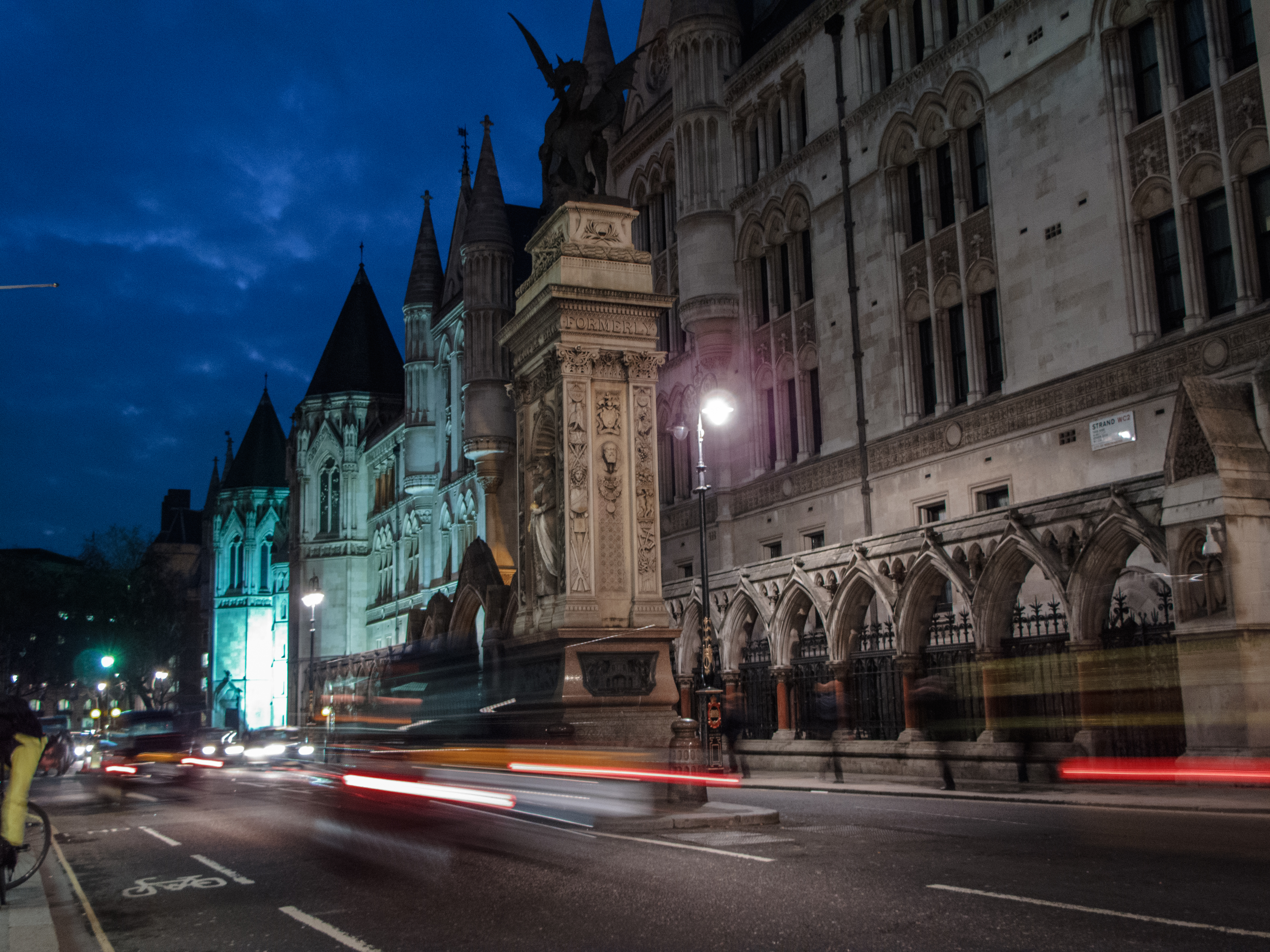
Any person in the UK who is significantly affected by a public body's act can challenge a decision by judicial review. The claims usually begin in the High Court.

Administrative law, through judicial review, is essential to hold executive power and public bodies accountable under the law. In practice, constitutional principles emerge through cases of judicial review, because every public body, whose decisions affect people's lives, is created and bound by law. A person can apply to the High Court to challenge a public body's decision if they have a "sufficient interest", within three months of the grounds of the cause of action becoming known. By contrast, claims against public bodies in tort or contract, where the Limitation Act 1980 usually sets the period as 6 years.

Almost any public body, or private bodies exercising public functions, can be the target of judicial review, including a government department, a local council, any Minister, the Prime Minister, or any other body that is created by law. The only public body whose decisions cannot be reviewed is Parliament, when it passes an Act. Otherwise, a claimant can argue that a public body's decision was unlawful in five main types of case: (1) it exceeded the lawful power of the body, used its power for an improper purpose, or acted unreasonably, (2) it violated a legitimate expectation, (3) failed to exercise relevant and independent judgement, (4) exhibited bias or a conflict of interest, or failed to give a fair hearing, and (5) violated a human right.

As a remedy, a claimant can ask for the public body's decisions to be declared void and quashed (or certiorari), or it could ask for an order to make the body do something (or mandamus), or prevent the body from acting unlawfully (or prohibition). A court may also declare the parties' rights and duties, give an injunction, or compensation could also be payable in tort or contract.

== History ==
John Ball, a leader of the Peasants' Revolt of 1381 following repression after the Black Death, preached that "matters goeth not well to pass in England, nor shall not do till everything be common, and that there be no villains nor gentlemen, but that we may be all unied [sic] together, and that the lords be no greater masters than we be."

The history of the British constitution, though officially beginning in 1800, traces back to a time long before the four nations of England, Scotland, Wales and Ireland were fully formed. Before the Norman Invasion of 1066, the written history of law was scant.

Following the conquest, according to the legal record Laws of Edward the Confessor, in 1070 William the Conqueror, on the advice of the King's Council (Curia Regis), summoned nobles learned in the law from all parts of the country in order to learn the established laws and customs. After hearing from 12 men from each county on oath, he expressed the wish to establish Norse law as the common law in England under one monarch, because his ancestors and those of his Norman barons all came from Norway. He was, however, persuaded by those summoned, that the laws of the Britons, English and Picts should remain in force 'because it was hard to adopt laws and to judge according to those that they did not know'. It is recorded that 'Finally, by the counsel and at the request of his barons, he acquiesced' and authorised and confirmed the laws as they were under Edward the Confessor.

The Domesday Book was compiled in 1086 cataloguing all land and labour to levy taxes. Just 12 per cent of people were free, while the feudal system made others serfs, slaves or bordars and cottars.

Henry II, who became the monarch in 1154, established the common law by creating a unified system of law "common" to the country.

In 1190 Richard the Lionheart, more closely tied with the Pope in Rome, joined the Third Crusade to invade the Holy Land, but at great cost. Taxes levied by Richard I, and his successor King John to pay for the wars led to intense discontent, and the aristocracy forcing the King to sign Magna Carta 1215. This was a commitment to hold 'common counsel' before any taxation, hold courts at a fixed place, hold trials according to law or before an accused's peers, guarantee free movement of people for trade, and give back common land.

Failure to abide by Magna Carta led to the First Barons' War, and the popular legend of Robin Hood emerged: a returned crusader who robbed from the rich to give to the poor. The commitments on common land were soon recast in the Charter of the Forest 1217, signed at St Paul's by Henry III. These documents established that the monarch, even with apparent authority from God, was bound by law, and it remains 'the nearest approach to an irrepealable "fundamental statute" that England has ever had.'

Following the conquest of Wales by Edward I, the Statute of Rhuddlan imposed English common law onto Wales in 1284, although allowed some continuation of Welsh law in civil cases.

Throughout the Middle Ages, common land was a source of welfare for common people, peasant labourers bound by a feudal system of control. In 1348, the Black Death struck England, and killed around a third of the population. As peasants lost their lords, and there was a shortage of workers, wages rose. The King and Parliament responded with the Statute of Labourers 1351 to freeze wage rises. This led to the Peasants' Revolt of 1381, where leaders demanded an end to feudalism, and for everything to be held in common. Despite the revolt's violent repression, slavery and serfdom broke down, yet most people remained without any substantial liberty, in political or economic rights. As sheep farming became more profitable than agricultural work, enclosures of common land dispossessed more people, who turned into paupers and were punished.

Under Henry VIII, to seal a divorce from Catherine of Aragon and marry Anne Boleyn (who he soon beheaded for supposed infidelity), the Church of England was declared separate from Rome in the Act of Supremacy 1534, with the King as the head. The Law in Wales Act 1535 annexed Wales into England in one administrative system, while the King became ever more despotic, executing the Lord Chancellor, Sir Thomas More in 1535, and Dissolution of the monasteries and murdering those who resisted. After Henry VIII died, and power struggles following the death of his boy Edward VI at age 15, Elizabeth I, the daughter of Henry VIII and Anne Boleyn, took the throne in 1558. Half a century of prosperity followed as Elizabeth I avoided wars, and founded corporations including the East India Company to monopolise trade routes. Under her successor, James I, further companies were created to colonise North America, including the London Company and the Virginia Company in 1606, and the Massachusetts Bay Company in 1628. Many religious dissidents left England to settle the new world.

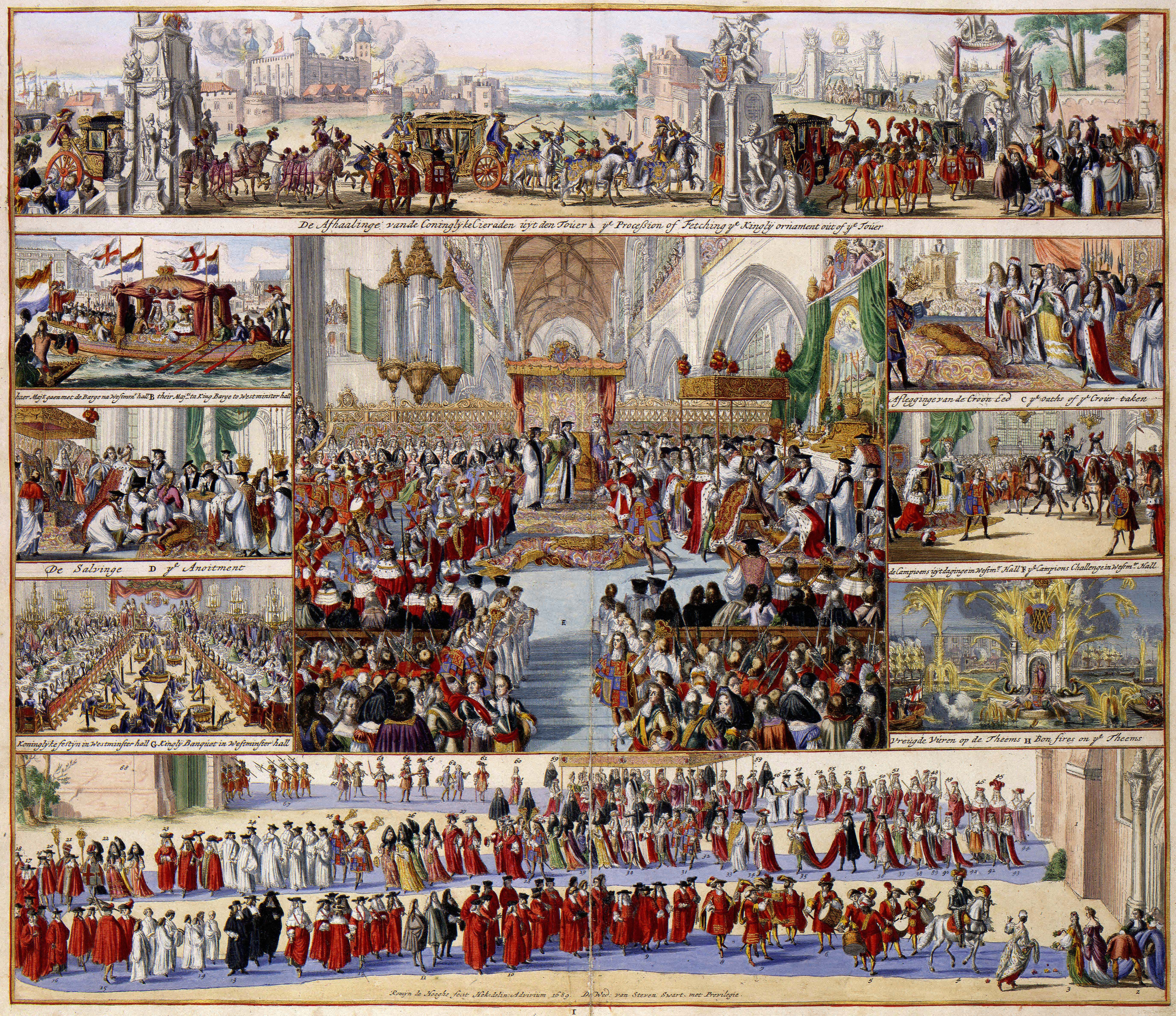
The Glorious Revolution of 1688 confirmed Parliament's supremacy over the monarch, represented by John Locke's Second Treatise on Government (1689). This laid the foundations for a peaceful unification of England and Scotland in the Act of Union 1707.

While Elizabeth I maintained a Protestant church, under her successor James VI and I, who unified the Scottish and English Crowns, religious and political tensions grew as he asserted a divine right of Kings. This prompted a series of cases from Sir Edward Coke, the Chief Justice of the Common Pleas and then King's Bench courts, which denied that the King could pass judgement in legal proceedings, and held that the royal prerogative was subject to the law and cannot be expanded. Coke CJ went even further in Dr Bonham's case, holding that even that "the common law will control Acts of Parliament". Though supported by some judges, the idea that common law courts could nullify Acts of Parliament was rejected, and the common law was formally placed under the King's control in the Earl of Oxford's case, establishing that equity (then administered by the Lord Chancellor in the House of Lords) was above common law.

Coke fell from favour, and was removed from judicial office. When Charles I succeeded to the throne in 1625, and more fervently asserted a divine right, including the ability to levy tax without Parliament, Coke and others presented the Petition of Right 1628. This demanded the King to abide by Magna Carta, levy no tax without Parliament, not arbitrarily commit people to prison, not have martial law in times of peace, and not billet soldiers in private homes. Charles I responded by shutting down or proroguing Parliament and taxing trade (or "ship money") without authority. The country descended into the English Civil War in 1642 culminating in the capture and execution of King Charles I on Whitehall in 1649 by the New Model Army led by Oliver Cromwell.

Cromwell, not wishing to become a King, became a de facto dictator. After his death, the monarchy was restored with Charles II in 1660, but his successor James VII and II again attempted to assert divine right to rule. In 1688, Parliament 'invited' a replacement King and Queen, William and Mary of Orange, and after a brief conflict forced James II out. Known as the Glorious Revolution, Parliament proclaimed a new Bill of Rights 1689, with a Claim of Right Act 1689 in Scotland, that cemented Parliamentary sovereignty. As well as reaffirming Magna Carta, it says the 'pretended power of suspending laws or the execution of laws by regal authority without consent of Parliament is illegal', that 'election of members of Parliament ought to be free', and that 'Parliament ought to be held frequently'. The justification for government itself, encapsulated by John Locke in his Second Treatise on Government was the protection of people's rights: "lives, liberties and estates."

With Parliamentary sovereignty as the cornerstone of the new constitution, Parliament proceeded to set up a system of finance in the Bank of England Act 1694 and the Act of Settlement 1700 created an independent system of justice: judges were salaried and could not be removed except by both Houses of Parliament, no member of the House of Commons could be paid by the Crown, and the Crown had to be Anglican. In 1703, Ashby v White established that the right to vote was a constitutional right. The Acts of Union 1707, ratifying the Treaty of Union 1707, between the then-independent states of Scotland and England, resulted in them both merging their states to create a new state, Great Britain, and dissolving their parliaments to create a new Parliament, which gave Scottish electors representation in Westminster. The Treaty also stipulated that Scottish private law would continue under a Scottish court system.

The new union was soon faced with disaster as in the Treaty of Utrecht, Spain granted the Asiento de Negros to Britain, allowing British merchants to sell slaves in Spanish America. The South Sea Company, incorporated to monopolise the asiento licence, became the object of mass financial speculation, provoked by government ministers interested in its rising share price. When it transpired, contrary to promoters' stories, that no trade was done because the Spanish had revoked their promise the stock market crashed, driving economic chaos.

This was made worse by the decision of conservative politicians to endorse the company to take over the national debt as an alternative financier to the government over the Whig dominated Bank of England. The result of the crash was that the chancellor of the exchequer was imprisoned in the Tower of London for his corruption, the Postmaster General committed suicide, and the disgraced Lord Chancellor was replaced with Lord King LC who promptly ruled that people in a position of trust must avoid any possibility of a conflict of interest. Out of the chaos, Robert Walpole emerged as a stable political figure who for 21 years held a majority of the House of Commons, and is now considered the first "Prime Minister".

In 1765, Entick v Carrington established that the government could do nothing but that which was empowered by law, while the first teacher of English law, William Blackstone represented the standard view in his Commentaries on the Laws of England that slavery was unlawful and that "the spirit of liberty is so deeply ingrained in our constitution" any person enslaved in England must be freed. However, the Atlantic slave trade had accelerated to the North American colonies. In 1772, when Lord Mansfield ruled in Somerset v Stewart that slavery was unlawful at common law, this set off a wave of outrage in the southern colonies of America, whose economies were heavily dependent on slavery. Together with northern colonies' grievances over taxation without representation, this led to the American Revolution and declaration of independence in 1776. The British military failed to hold control. Instead, it began settling Australia from 1788.

In 1789, the French Revolution broke out, and the French King was deposed with demands for "liberty, equality and fraternity". The British aristocracy reacted with repression on free speech and association to forestall any similar movement. While figures like Jeremy Bentham called natural rights "nonsense upon stilts", Mary Wollstonecraft called for A Vindication of the Rights of Woman as well as men, arguing that unjust gender and class oppression flowed from "the respect paid to property... as from a poisoned fountain". While successful in the Napoleonic Wars in defeating France, and cementing union with Ireland in the Act of Union 1800, liberty, freedom and democracy were scarcely protected in the new "United Kingdom".

During this time, with the invention of the steam engine the Industrial Revolution had begun. Poverty had also accelerated through the Speenhamland system of poor laws by subsidising employers and landowners with parish rates. The Corn Laws from 1815 further impoverished people by fixing prices to maintain landowner profits. While the Great Reform Act 1832 extended the vote slightly, only those with property had any representation in Parliament. The 1833 Slavery Abolition Act abolished slavery within the British Empire, compensating slave owners and made ex-slaves in the colonies work for their owners for four to six years as indentured servants without pay; this was abolished in 1838 after public outcry. With the Poor Law Amendment Act 1834, further punishment for poverty was inflicted as people were put into work houses if found to be unemployed. In R v Lovelass a group of agricultural workers who formed a trade union were prosecuted and sentenced to be transported to Australia under the Unlawful Oaths Act 1797, triggering mass protests.

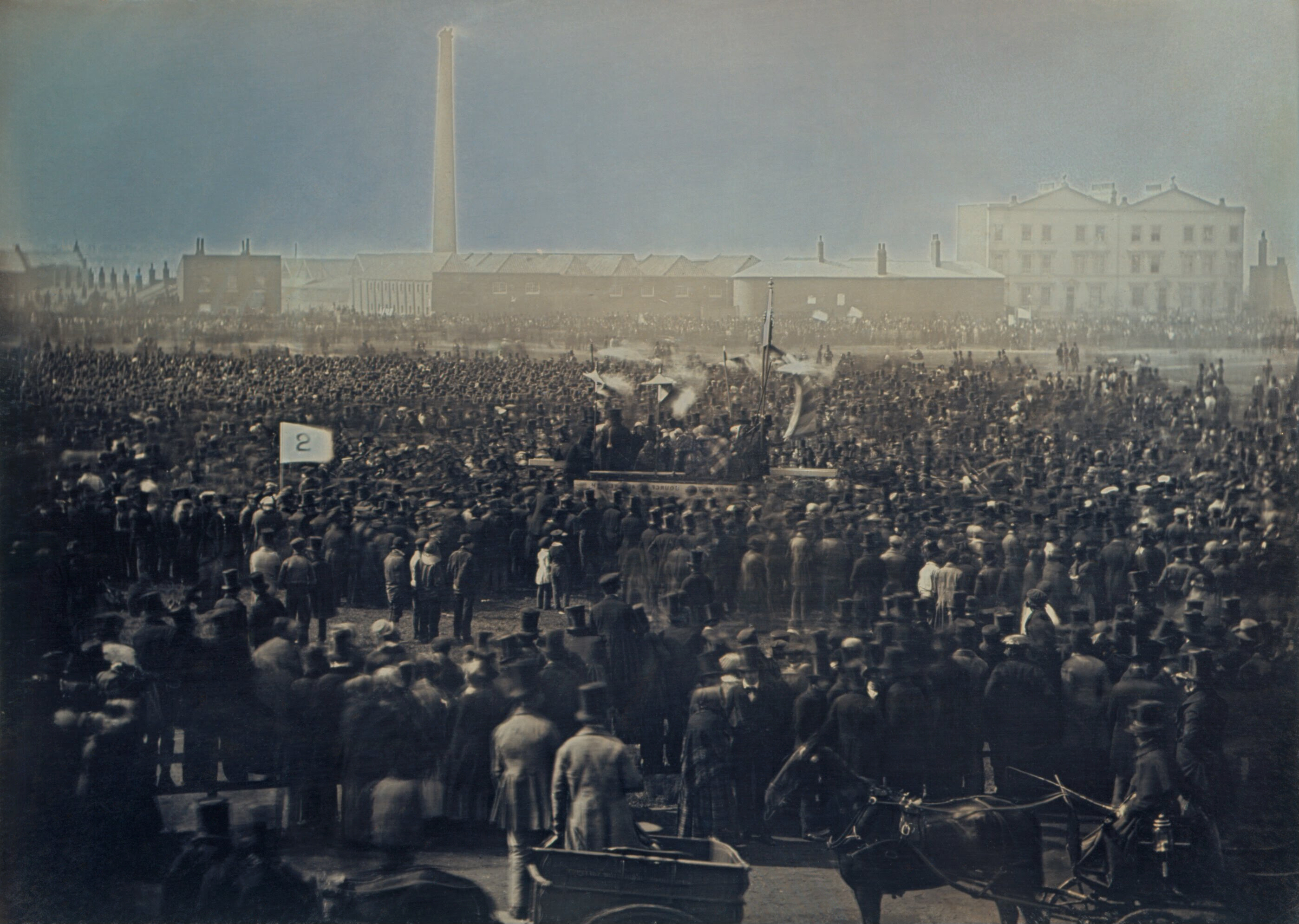
Demanding democratic reform, the Chartists met on Kennington Common during the Revolutions of 1848.

A movement called Chartism grew demanding the right to vote for everyone in free and fair elections. As the great famine hit Ireland and millions migrated to the United States, Chartists staged a mass march from Kennington Common to Parliament in 1848 as revolutions broke out across Europe, and the Communist Manifesto was drafted by German revolutionary Karl Marx and Manchester factory owner Friedrich Engels. While the Crimean War distracted from social reform and Viscount Palmerston opposed anything, the American Civil War of 1860 to 1865 ended slavery in the US, and the UK gradually enabled greater political freedom.

In the Second Reform Act 1867 more middle class property owners were enfranchised, the Elementary Education Act 1870 provided free primary school, and the Trade Union Act 1871 enabled free association without criminal penalty. The Representation of the People Act 1884 reduced the property qualification further, so that around one third of men in Britain could vote. However, the act did not establish universal suffrage; 40% of men and all women could not vote.

From the start of the 20th century, Britain underwent vast social and constitutional change, beginning with an attempt by the House of Lords to suppress British trade unions. In response, the labour movement organised to support representatives in Parliament, and in the 1906 general election won 29 seats and supported the Liberal Party's programme of reform. This included a legal guarantee of the right of unions to collectively bargain and strike for fair wages, an old age pension, a system of minimum wages, a People's Budget with higher taxes on the wealthy to fund spending. After a further election brought by the House of Lords blocking reform, Parliament pass a National Insurance system for welfare, and the Parliament Act 1911 prevented the House of Lords blocking legislation for more than two years, and removed the right to delay any money bills.

Despite this, the Liberal government, against the opposition of Labour, armed for and entered the First World War. At the end of the War, with millions dead, Parliament passed the Representation of the People Act 1918 which enabled every adult male the vote, although it was only after the mass protest of the Suffragettes that the Representation of the People (Equal Franchise) Act 1928 enabled all women to vote, and that the UK became democratic. The War also triggered uprising in Ireland, and an Irish War of Independence leading to the partition of the island between the Republic of Ireland in the south and Northern Ireland in the Government of Ireland Act 1920.

The Versailles Treaty at the end of the War demanded German reparations, beggaring the country through the 1920s and upon the Great Depression leading to a fascist collapse under Hitler. The failed international law system, was replaced following the Second World War with the United Nations where the UK held a permanent seat on the UN Security Council. However the British Empire began to crumble as decolonisation occurred in Asia, Africa and the Americas. To prevent any recurrence of the Holocaust and war, the Council of Europe was established to draft the European Convention on Human Rights in 1950. Further it was seen that the only way to prevent conflict was through economic integration. The European Economic Community, which became the European Union in 1992, was supported by Winston Churchill with the UK to be "at the centre", although it did not enter until the European Communities Act 1972.

The evolution of the British Empire. After the end of the Second World War, the Empire was gradually dismantled via a process of decolonisation, with the majority of former British colonies choosing to join the Commonwealth of Nations. The Commonwealth is open to any country committed to peace, liberty, equality, and development, as stipulated in the Harare Declaration of 1991.

Under Margaret Thatcher, significant cuts were made to public services, labour rights, and the powers of local government, including abolishing the Greater London Council. However some powers were restored with extensive devolution of power in the Scotland Act 1998, Northern Ireland Act 1998, Greater London Authority Act 1999 and the Government of Wales Act 2006. After many years of armed conflict in Northern Ireland, the Good Friday Agreement of 1998 brought peace. The Human Rights Act 1998 empowered courts to apply Convention rights without the need for claimants to take cases to the Strasbourg court. The House of Lords Act 1999 reduced but did not eliminate hereditary peers. Since the 2008 financial crisis, a Conservative and Liberal Democrat coalition launched a programme of "austerity" cuts, and cemented their term in the Fixed-term Parliaments Act 2011. After 2015, however, early elections were held anyway in 2017, following a referendum on EU membership that resulted in 51.89 per cent of people favouring to leave, and 48.11 per cent of voters favouring to remain.

=== Worldwide influence ===
Aspects of the British constitution were adopted in the constitutions and legal systems of other countries around the world, particularly those that were part of, or formerly part of, the British Empire including the United States and those countries that adopted the Westminster parliamentary system. The British constitution is the source of the modern concepts of the rule of law, parliamentary sovereignty and judicial independence and adoption of British constitutional principles propagated their spread around the world. One of the oldest constitutional systems in the world, dating back over one thousand years, it is characterised by the stability of its governing institutions, its capacity to absorb change, a bicameral legislature and the concept of responsible government.

== Theory and reform ==
The legal scholar Eric Barendt argues that the uncodified nature of the United Kingdom constitution does not mean it should not be characterised as a "constitution", but also claims that the lack of an effective separation of powers, and the fact that parliamentary sovereignty allows Parliament to overrule fundamental rights, makes it to some extent a "façade" constitution. Lord Scarman presents a spirited argument for a written constitution for the UK, but still refers to the 1688 compromise and resulting Acts of Parliament as a constitution.

A. V. Dicey identified that ultimately "the electorate are politically sovereign", and Parliament is legally sovereign. Barendt argues that the greater political party discipline in the House of Commons that has evolved since Dicey's era, and the reduction in checks on governmental power, has led to an excessively powerful government that is not legally constrained by the observance of fundamental rights. A Constitution would impose limits on what Parliament could do. To date, the Parliament of the UK has no limit on its power other than the possibility of extra-parliamentary action (by the people) and of other sovereign states (pursuant to treaties made by Parliament and otherwise). It has been commented by Dicey that formally, the British Parliament was limited by the terms of the international treaties that created it in the first place. His comment that it would be imprudent for the British Parliament to try and abolish Scots Law, for example, has been criticised judicially as "cynical" but was written in the high Victorian era when Parliament was grappling with the concept of Irish Home Rule, strongly opposed by many politicians at the time.

Proponents of a codified constitution argue it would strengthen the legal protection of democracy and freedom. As a strong advocate of the "unwritten constitution", Dicey highlighted that English rights were embedded in the general English common law of personal liberty, and "the institutions and manners of the nation". Opponents of a codified constitution argue that the country is not based on a founding document that tells its citizens who they are and what they can do. There is also a belief that any unwarranted encroachment on the spirit of constitutional authority would be stiffly resisted by the British people, a perception expounded by the 19th century American judge Justice Bradley in the course of delivering his opinion in a case heard in Louisiana in 1873: "England has no written constitution, it is true; but it has an unwritten one, resting in the acknowledged, and frequently declared, privileges of Parliament and the people, to violate which in any material respect would produce a revolution in an hour."

The Labour government under prime minister Tony Blair instituted constitutional reforms in the late 1990s and early-to-mid 2000s. The effective incorporation of the European Convention on Human Rights into British law through the Human Rights Act 1998 has granted citizens specific positive rights and given the judiciary some power to enforce them. The courts can advise Parliament of primary legislation that conflicts with the Act by means of "declarations of incompatibility" – however, Parliament is not bound to amend the law nor can the judiciary void any statute – and it can refuse to enforce, or quash, any incompatible secondary legislation, as well as any incompatible primary legislation passed by the devolved legislatures, to the extent of the incompatibility. Any actions of government authorities that violate Convention rights are illegal (and can be quashed) except if mandated by an Act of Parliament.

Changes also include the Constitutional Reform Act 2005 which alters the structure of the House of Lords to separate its judicial and legislative functions. For example, the legislative, judicial and executive functions of the Lord Chancellor are now shared between the Lord Chancellor (executive), Lord Chief Justice (judicial) and the newly created post of Lord Speaker (legislative). The role of Law Lord (a member of the judiciary in the House of Lords) was abolished by transferring them to the new Supreme Court of the United Kingdom in October 2009; although the judges of the new court retained their peerages, they are disqualified from sitting in either House as long as they hold office as such.

Gordon Brown launched a "Governance of Britain" process when he took over as PM in 2007. This was an ongoing process of constitutional reform with the Ministry of Justice as lead ministry. The Constitutional Reform and Governance Act 2010 is a piece of constitutional legislation. It enshrines in statute the impartiality and integrity of the British Civil Service and the principle of open and fair recruitment. It enshrines in law the Ponsonby Rule which requires that treaties are laid before Parliament before they can be ratified.

The Coalition Government formed in May 2010 proposed a series of further constitutional reforms in their coalition agreement. Consequently, the Parliamentary Voting System and Constituencies Act 2011 and the Fixed-term Parliaments Act 2011 were passed, though the government of Boris Johnson subsequently repealed the latter in 2022. The Acts were intended to reduce the number of MPs in the House of Commons from 650 to 600, change the way the UK is divided into parliamentary constituencies, introduce a referendum on changing the system used to elect MPs, and take the power to dissolve Parliament away from the monarch. The Coalition also promised to introduce law on the reform of the House of Lords. In the referendum, the Alternative Vote system was rejected by 67% to 33%, and therefore all reforms regarding the voting system were dropped. Conservatives forced the government to drop House of Lords reforms, and the Liberal Democrats said they would refuse to support changes to the boundaries of constituencies, as they believed such changes favoured the Conservatives.

== See also ==
- Human rights in the United Kingdom
- British administrative law
- United Kingdom labour law
- English land law
- English contract law
- English trust law
- House of Lords Constitution Committee
- Political and Constitutional Reform Select Committee
- Parliament in the Making
- Royal Commission on the Constitution (United Kingdom)
- Power Inquiry
- Ancient constitution of England
- United Kingdom constitutional law
