= Ponsonby Rule =

Former constitutional convention regarding treaty ratification in the United Kingdom

The Ponsonby Rule was a constitutional convention in United Kingdom constitutional law that dictated that most international treaties had to be laid before Parliament 21 days before ratification.

On 11 November 2010, Part 2 of the Constitutional Reform and Governance Act 2010 was brought into force by a commencement order. It provides for the ratification of (non-EU) treaties and puts parliamentary scrutiny of treaties on a statutory footing. This changed the convention into a provision having legal force.

== History ==
From the late 19th century it became the common practice to present the treaties of the United Kingdom to Parliament after they had come into force.

On 1 April 1924, during the second reading debate on the Treaty of Peace (Turkey) Bill, Arthur Ponsonby (Parliamentary Under-Secretary of State for Foreign Affairs in Ramsay MacDonald's first Labour Government) made the following statement:

It is the intention of His Majesty's Government to lay on the table of both Houses of Parliament every treaty, when signed, for a period of 21 days, after which the treaty will be ratified and published and circulated in the Treaty Series. In the case of important treaties, the Government will, of course, take an opportunity of submitting them to the House for discussion within this period. But, as the Government cannot take upon itself to decide what may be considered important or unimportant, if there is a formal demand for discussion forwarded through the usual channels from the Opposition or any other party, time will be found for the discussion of the Treaty in question.

At the same time, he stated that:

Resolutions expressing Parliamentary approval of every Treaty before ratification would be a very cumbersome form of procedure and would burden the House with a lot of unnecessary business. The absence of disapproval may be accepted as sanction, and publicity and opportunity for discussion and criticism are the really material and valuable elements which henceforth will be introduced.

The Ponsonby Rule was withdrawn during the subsequent Baldwin Government, but was reinstated in 1929 and gradually hardened into a practice observed by all successive governments.

== Other countries ==
The practice on legislative approval of treaties before ratification varies from country to country. In most countries, the constitution requires most treaties to be approved by the legislature before they can formally enter into force and bind the country in question. This is particularly the case in states where international treaties become part of domestic law directly, without the need for special implementation as required in the case of the United Kingdom.

In countries with a strong separation of powers, this may lead to treaties being signed by the executive, but not being ratified because of legislative opposition.

In the United States, the president must submit treaties to the Senate for its advice and consent to ratification, which requires a two-thirds vote. A famous example of a treaty not receiving consent is the Treaty of Versailles, which ended World War I, because of opposition to the League of Nations.

In Australia, the opposite situation exists although the practical effect does not greatly differ. The executive (that is, the Australian Government) may enter into a binding treaty without the involvement of Parliament. The Department of Foreign Affairs and Trade states "The power to enter into treaties is an executive power within Section 61 of the Australian Constitution and accordingly, is the formal responsibility of the Executive rather than the Parliament" and discusses the issues surrounding this fact, including the way treaties are handled in practice (which does involve Parliament). Implementation of treaties does require legislation by federal parliament, following Section 51(xxix) of the Australian Constitution. Treaties must be signed by the Governor-General of Australia.

== See also ==
- Foreign, Commonwealth and Development Office
- Constitution of the United Kingdom
