= The Governance of Britain =

2007 Green paper on constitutional reform in the United Kingdom

The Governance of Britain was a Green Paper issued by the Government of Gordon Brown in 2007. The Green Paper looked at issues of constitutional reform including House of Lords reform and limiting the powers of the executive.

Its last section on "Citizenship and National identity" was criticized by David Beetham, who expressed "astonishment that so much effort is felt to be necessary chasing a will of the wisp called Britishness" and found its language "prescriptive, even hortatory".

It is not to be confused with Harold Wilson's book The Governance of Britain, 1976.
