= State trials =

Type of trial

In English law, the term state trials primarily denotes trials relating to offences against the state. In practice it is a term often used of cases illustrative of the law relating to state officers or of international or constitutional law.

== Bibliographical history ==
The first collection of accounts of state trials was published in 1719 in four volumes. Although without an editor's name, it appears that Thomas Salmon (1679–1767), an historical and geographical writer, was responsible for the collection. A second edition, increased to six volumes, under the editorship of Sollom Emlyn (1697–1754), appeared in 1730. This edition contained a lengthy preface critically surveying the condition of English law at the time.

A third edition appeared in 1742, in eight volumes, the seventh and eighth volumes having been added in 1835. Ninth and tenth volumes were added in 1766, and a fourth edition, comprising ten volumes, with the trials arranged chronologically, was published the same year. A fifth edition, originated by William Cobbett, but edited by Thomas Bayly Howell (1768–1815) and known as Cobbett's Complete Collection of State Trials, was published between 1809 and 1826. This edition is in thirty-three volumes; twenty-one of them, giving the more important state trials down to 1781, were edited by TB Howell, and the remaining volumes, bringing the trials down to 1820, by his son Thomas Jones Howell (d. 1858).

A new series, under the direction of a parliamentary committee, was projected in 1885, with the object of bringing the trials down to a later date. Eight volumes were published in 1888–1898, bringing the work down to 1858. The first three of these were edited by Sir John Macdonell, the remaining five by John Edward Power Wallis. For citation, their name may be abbreviated to St Tr (NS).

Selections have also been edited by Harry Lushington Stephen and others.
