= Charles Pratt, 1st Earl Camden =

English lawyer, judge, and politician (1714–1794)

The Right Honourable The Earl Camden PC
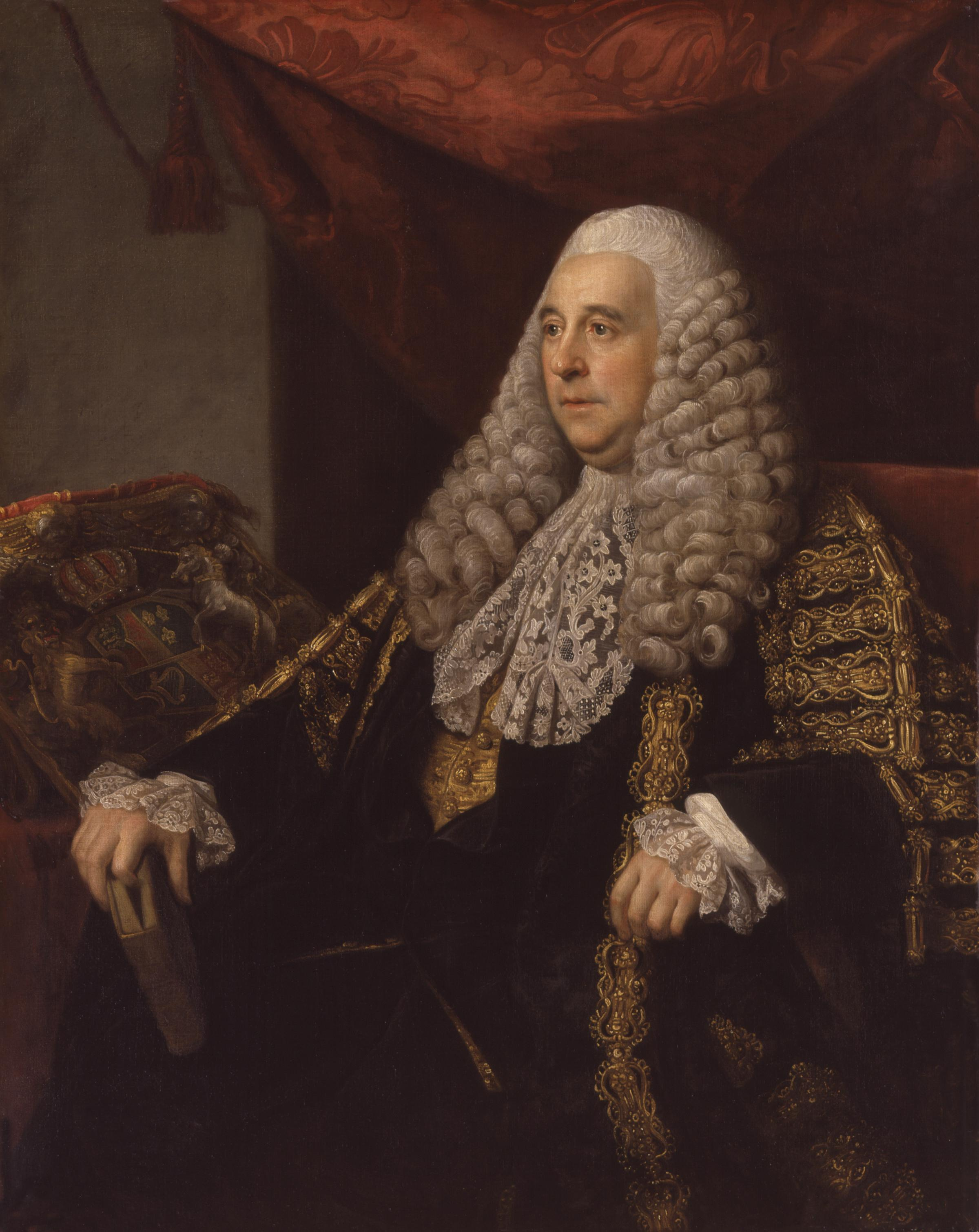
- Charles Pratt, 1st Earl Camden by Nathaniel Dance

Lord Chancellor
- In office 30 July 1766 – 17 January 1770
- Monarch: George III
- Prime Minister: The Earl of Chatham; The Duke of Grafton
- Preceded by: The Earl of Northington
- Succeeded by: Charles Yorke

Lord President of the Council
- In office 27 March 1782 – 2 April 1783
- Monarch: George III
- Prime Minister: The Marquess of Rockingham; The Earl of Shelburne
- Preceded by: The Earl Bathurst
- Succeeded by: The Viscount Stormont
- In office 1 December 1784 – 18 April 1794
- Monarch: George III
- Prime Minister: William Pitt the Younger
- Preceded by: The Earl Gower
- Succeeded by: The Earl Fitzwilliam

Personal details
- Born: before 21 March 1714 Kensington, London, England
- Died: 18 April 1794 (aged 80)
- Education: King's College, Cambridge

Charles Pratt, 1st Earl Camden, PC (baptised 21 March 1714 – 18 April 1794) was an English lawyer, judge and Whig politician who was first to hold the title of Earl Camden. As a lawyer and judge he was a leading proponent of civil liberties, championing the rights of the jury, and limiting the powers of the State in leading cases such as Entick v Carrington.

He held the offices of Chief Justice of the Common Pleas, Attorney-General and Lord High Chancellor of Great Britain, and was a confidant of Pitt the Elder, supporting Pitt in the controversies over John Wilkes and American independence. However, he clung to office himself, even when Pitt was out of power, serving in the cabinet for fifteen years and under five different prime ministers.

During his life, Pratt played a leading role in opposing perpetual copyright, resolving the regency crisis of 1788 and championing Fox's Libel Bill. He started the development of the settlement that was later to become Camden Town in London.

== Early life ==
Born in Kensington in 1714, he was a descendant of an old Devon family of high standing, the third son of Sir John Pratt, Chief Justice of the King's Bench in the reign of George I. Charles's mother, Elizabeth, was the daughter of Rev. Hugh Wilson of Trefeglwys, and the aunt of landscape painter Richard Wilson. He received his early education at Eton, where he became acquainted with William Pitt, and King's College, Cambridge. He had already developed an interest in constitutional law and civil liberties. In 1734 he became a fellow of his college, and in the following year obtained his degree of BA. Having adopted his father's profession, he had entered the Middle Temple in 1728, and ten years later he was called to the Bar.

== Early years at the Bar ==
He practised at first in the courts of common law, travelling also the western circuit. For some years his practice was so limited, and he became so much discouraged that he seriously thought of turning his back on the law and entering the church. He listened, however, to the advice of his friend Sir Robert Henley, a brother barrister, and persevered, working on and waiting for success. Reputedly, once instructed as Henley's junior, Henley feigned illness so that Pratt could lead and earn the credit.

He was further aided by an advantageous marriage on 5 October 1749 to Elizabeth, daughter of Nicholas Jeffreys of the Priory, Brecknock, by whom he had a son John Jeffreys, his successor in title and estates, and four daughters, of whom the eldest, Frances, married Robert Stewart, 1st Marquess of Londonderry on 7 June 1775.

The first case which brought him prominently into notice and gave him assurance of ultimate success was the government prosecution, in 1752, of a bookseller, William Owen. Owen had published a book The Case of Alexander Murray, Esq; in an Appeal to the people of Great Britain which the House of Commons had, by resolution of the House, condemned as "an impudent, malicious, scandalous and seditious libel". The author had left the country so the weight of the government's censure fell on Owen. Pratt appeared in Owen's defence and his novel argument was that it was not the sole role of the jury to determine the fact of publication but that it was further their right to assess the intent of a libel. In his summing up, the judge, Lord Chief Justice Sir William Lee directed the jury to find Owen guilty as publication was proved and the intent of the contents was a question of law for the judge, not a question of fact for the jury. The jury disagreed and acquitted Owen. Pratt was appointed King's Counsel in 1755, and knighted in December 1761.

== Political career ==
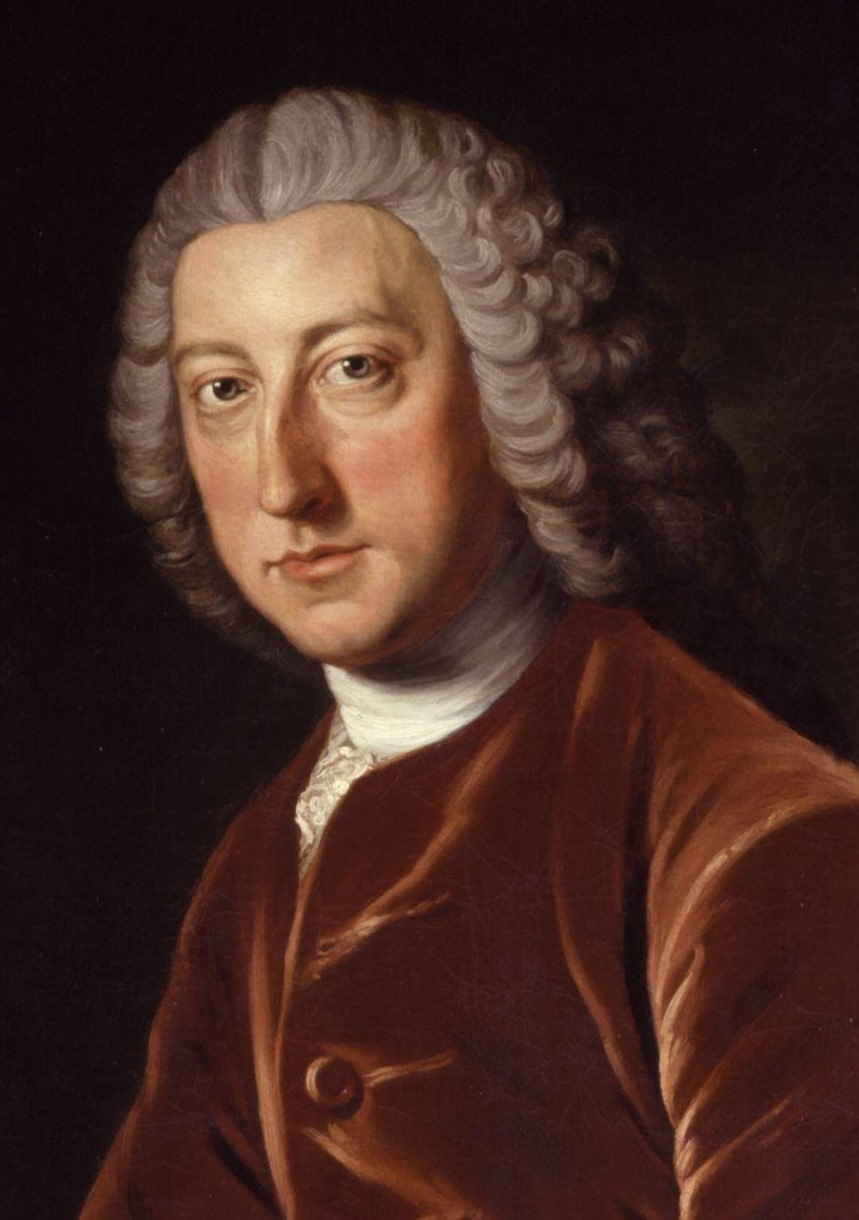
William Pitt the Elder

Since their youthful meeting at Eton, Pitt had continued to consult Pratt on legal and constitutional matters and Pratt became involved in the group that met at the Leicester House home of George Prince of Wales and who were opposed to the government of Prime Minister the Duke of Newcastle. In 1756, Newcastle offered Pratt a judgeship but Pratt preferred to take the role of Attorney General to the Prince of Wales.

In July 1757, Pitt formed a coalition government with Newcastle and insisted on Pratt's appointment as Attorney-General. Pratt was preferred over Solicitor General Charles Yorke. Yorke was the son of Lord Hardwicke, a political ally of Newcastle who, as Lord High Chancellor of Great Britain had obstructed Pratt's career in favour of his own son. Though this led to an uncomfortable relationship between the two law officers of the Crown, it led to the landmark Pratt-Yorke opinion of 24 December 1757 whereby the pair distinguished overseas territories acquired by conquest from those acquired by private treaty. They asserted that, while the Crown of Great Britain enjoyed sovereignty over both, only the property of the former was vested in the Crown. Though the original opinion related to the British East India Company, it came to be applied elsewhere in the developing British Empire.

The same year he entered the House of Commons as Member of Parliament (MP) for the borough of Downton in Wiltshire. He sat in Parliament for four years, but did not distinguish himself as a debater. He introduced the Habeas corpus Amendment Bill of 1758, which was intended to extend the writ of Habeas corpus from criminal law to civil and political cases. Despite Pitt's support, the Bill fell in the House of Lords. At the same time, his professional practice increased, particularly his Chancery practice which made him financially secure and enabled him to purchase the Camden Place estate in Kent.

As Attorney-General, Pratt prosecuted Florence Hensey, an Irishman who had spied for France, and John Shebbeare, a violent party writer of the day. Shebbeare had published a libel against the government contained in his Letters to the People of England, which were published in 1756–58. As evidence of Pratt's moderation in a period of passionate party warfare and frequent state trials, it is notable that this was the only official prosecution for libel that he started and that he maintained his earlier insistence that the decision lay with the jury. He led for the Crown in the prosecution of Laurence Shirley, 4th Earl Ferrers for the murder of a servant, a case that shocked European society.

== Wilkes and Entick ==
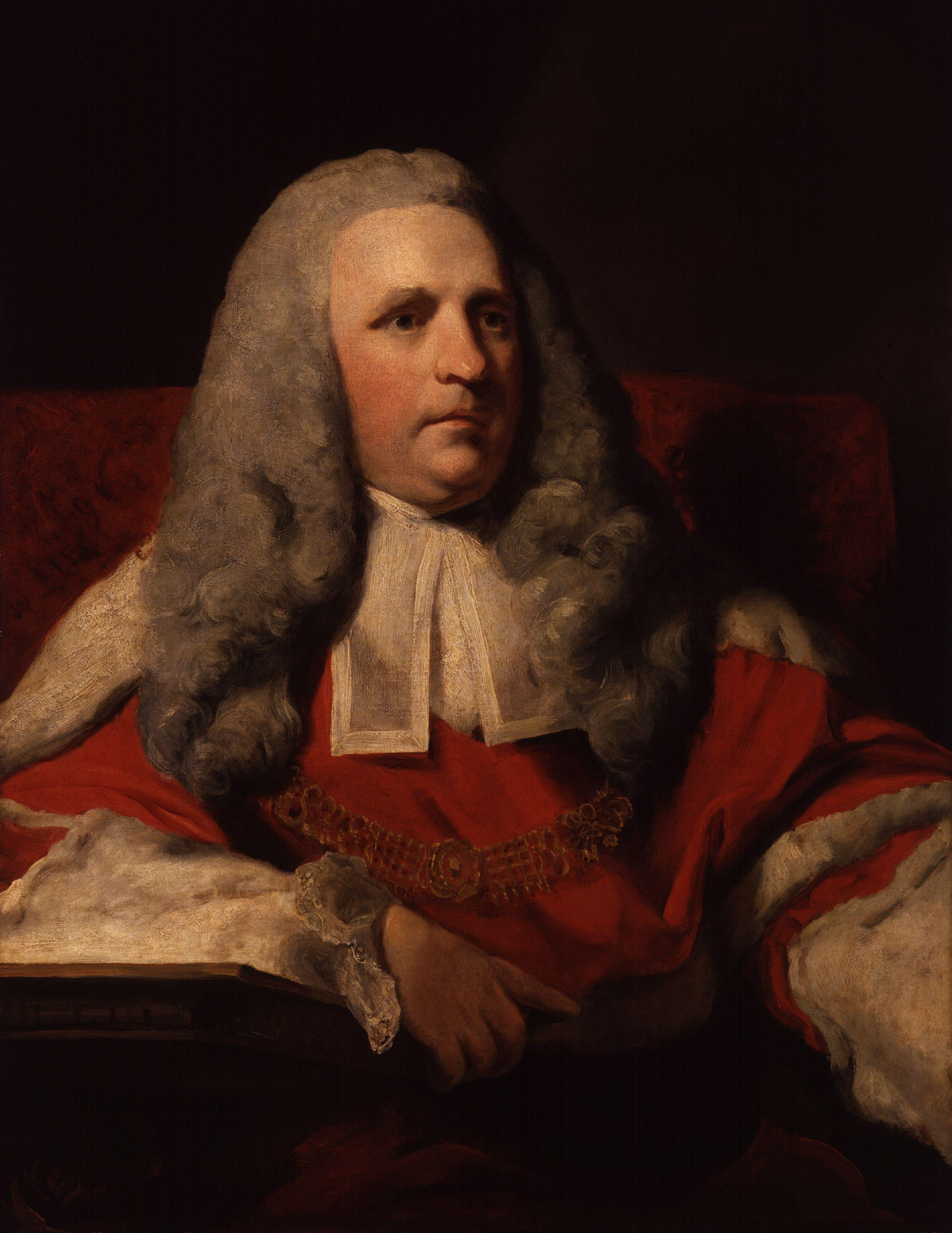
Sir Charles Pratt by Joshua Reynolds.

Pratt lost his patron when Pitt left office in October 1761 but in January 1762, he resigned from the Commons, was raised to the bench as Chief Justice of the Common Pleas, received the customary knighthood and was sworn into the Privy Council.

The Common Pleas was not an obvious forum for a jurist with constitutional interest, dealing as it did principally with disputes between private parties. However, on 30 April 1763, Member of Parliament John Wilkes was arrested under a general warrant for alleged seditious libel in issue No.45 of The North Briton. Pratt freed Wilkes holding that parliamentary privilege gave him immunity from arrest on such a charge. The decision earned Pratt some favour with the radical faction in London and seems to have spurred him, over the summer of that year to encourage juries to award disproportionate and excessive damages to printers unlawfully arrested over the same matter. Wilkes was awarded £1,000 (£127,000 at 2003 prices) and Pratt condemned the use of general warrants for entry and search. Pratt pronounced with decisive and almost passionate energy against their legality, thus giving voice to the strong feeling of the nation and winning for himself an extraordinary degree of popularity as one of the maintainers of English civil liberties. Honours fell thick upon him in the form of addresses from the City of London and many large towns, and of presentations of freedom from various corporate bodies.

In 1762, the home of John Entick had been raided by officers of the Crown, searching for evidence of sedition. In the case of Entick v Carrington (1765), Pratt held that the raids were unlawful as they were without authority in statute or in common law.

== The American Stamp Act crisis ==
On 17 July 1765 Pratt was created Baron Camden, of Camden Place, in Chislehurst, Kent, becoming a member of the House of Lords. Prime Minister Lord Rockingham had unsuccessfully made this, and other appointments, to curry favour with Pitt but Camden was not over-eager to get involved in the crisis surrounding the Stamp Act 1765. Camden did attend the Commons on 14 January 1766 and his subsequent speeches on the matter in the Lords are so similar to Pitt's that he had clearly adopted the party line. He was one of only five Lords who voted against the Declaratory Act 1766, a resolution of the House insisting on Parliament's right to tax colonies overseas. Camden insisted that taxation was predicated on consent and that consent needed representation. However, when he came to support the government over the act's repeal, he rather unconvincingly purported to base his opinion on the actual hardship caused by the act rather than its constitutional basis.

== Lord Chancellor ==
In May 1766, Pitt again became prime minister and advanced Camden from the court of common pleas to take his seat as Lord High Chancellor of Great Britain on 30 July. Camden managed to negotiate an additional allowance of £1500 and a position for his son John. Camden carried out the role in an efficient manner, without any great legal innovation. He presided over the Court of Chancery from which only one of his decisions was overturned on appeal. He also presided over the judicial functions of the House of Lords where in 1767 he approved Lord Mansfield's ruling that the City of London could not fine dissenters who refused to serve the corporation. Dissenters were in any case prohibited from serving under the Corporation Act 1661. In 1768 in the House of Lords he again sat in a case involving John Wilkes, this time rejecting his appeal and finding that his consecutive, rather than concurrent sentences were lawful. He gave a controversial judgment in the Douglas Peerage case.

=== "A forty days tyranny" ===
However, Camden the politician was less of a champion of civil rights than Pratt the judge. The poor harvest of 1766 led to fears of high grain prices and starvation but parliament was prorogued and could not renew the export ban that expired on 26 August. Pitt, with Camden's support, called the Privy Council to issue a royal proclamation on 26 September to prohibit grain exports until parliament met. However, despite Camden's record on civil liberties, this proclamation was unlawful, contrary to art.2 of the Bill of Rights 1689 and both houses of parliament ultimately accused Pitt and Camden of tyranny. Camden pleaded necessity, a justification he had rejected in the Wilkes and Carrington trials, and styled it "a forty days tyranny". Ultimately the government was forced to suppress the parliamentary attacks by an act indemnifying those involved from legal action.

=== America ===
In 1767, the cabinet, of which Camden was a member, approved Charles Townshend's attempt to settle the American protest and revolt over taxation. Benjamin Franklin reportedly observed that it was "internal" taxes that the colonists objected to and Townshend took this to suggest that there would be little opposition to import duties imposed at the ports. Camden's support for the tax proposals would return to embarrass him.

Pitt and his followers had, after their initial opposition, come to support the Declaratory Act 1766 which asserted Great Britain's sovereignty over the American colonies. Further, continued unrest in America, stemming from Townshend's 1767 taxation scheme, brought a robust response from Pitt and Camden was his spokesman in the Lords. However, towards the end of 1767, Pitt, now raised to the Lords as Earl Chatham, fell ill and the Duke of Grafton stepped in as caretaker. Camden became indecisive in his own political role, writing to Grafton on 4 October 1768:

I do not know what to advise... I submit to the declaratory law, and have thought it my duty, upon that ground, as a minister, to exert my constitutional power to carry out the duty act into execution. But as a member of the legislature I cannot bring myself to advise violent measures.

Pitt resigned on 14 October and Camden, who continued to sit in the cabinet as Lord Chancellor, now took up a position of uncompromising hostility to the governments of Grafton and Lord North on America and on Wilkes. Camden opposed Lord Hillsborough's confrontational approach to the Americas, favouring conciliation and working on the development of reformed tax proposals. Camden personally promised the colonies that no further taxes would be levied, and voted in the cabinet minority who sought to repeal the tea duty.

=== John Wilkes MP ===
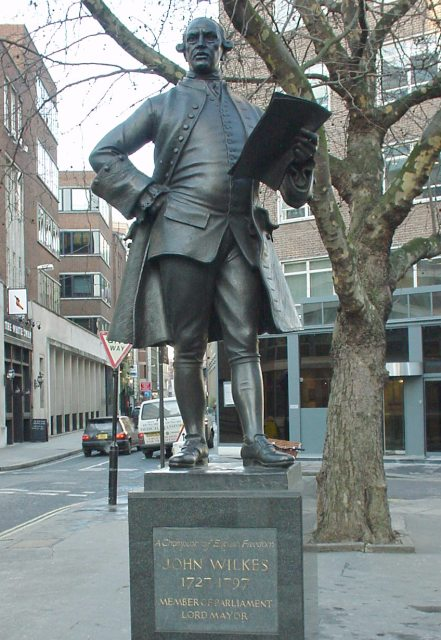
John Wilkes

On 28 March 1768, Wilkes was surprisingly elected as member for Middlesex, much to Grafton's distaste. Grafton canvassed Camden on whether Wilkes could be removed from parliament and Camden responded that, under the parliamentary privilege of the House to regulate its own membership, Wilkes could, though lawfully elected, be lawfully expelled. However, Camden saw that this was only likely to lead to Wilkes's re-election and an escalating crisis. The cabinet decided to seek Wilkes's expulsion but Camden was not content with the policy. By the end of 1769, he was in open opposition to the government and was making little contribution to discussions in cabinet. Only Royal pressure kept him in post. However, by the beginning of 1770, Chatham had returned to the fray, opposing government policies on Wilkes and America. On 9 January 1770, Chatham moved a motion opposing the government's policies and Camden stepped down from the woolsack to give a speech in support of the motion. However, he did not resign as Lord Chancellor until King George III, outraged by his conduct, demanded his dismissal on 17 January. He seems also to have resigned as a Chancery judge in late 1769.

== Working Lord ==
=== Into opposition ===
Chatham, Rockingham and Grenville were expected to combine to bring down Grafton, when it was expected that Lord Camden would return to the woolsack. However, though Grafton resigned, Lord North managed to form a successor administration and Camden was left to the opposition, continuing to sit in the Lords. From 1770 onwards, Chatham neglected parliamentary attendance and left leadership of the house to Lord Shelburne with whom Camden could manage only the coolest of relationships.

During 1770–71, Camden tussled with Lord Mansfield over the law of libel, Camden maintaining that the jury should not only decide whether the work in question was published but also whether the words themselves were defamatory or innocent. He opposed the extension of the Royal Marriages Act 1772 to all descendants of King George II, believing it to be impractical. In 1774, in the House of Lords appeal in the case of Donaldson v Beckett, Camden spoke against the concept of perpetual copyright for fear of inhibiting the advancement of learning. This was a key influence on the ultimate rejection of that year's Booksellers' Bill.

=== The American crisis of 1774 ===
The year 1774 brought a renewed crisis over America. The Boston Tea Party in 1773 led Lord North to seek a blockade of the city through the Boston Port Bill. Camden roundly criticised the taxes that had led to the American protests, as he had opposed them in Cabinet from 1767 to 1769, but was reminded that he was Lord Chancellor when they were imposed. The Chathamite faction went on to support the Bill and further to support the Massachusetts Government Act, Camden's inherent patriotism bringing him into line. However, by May, fears that the Bill would focus and strengthen American resistance led Camden to oppose the measure.

On 16 February 1775, Camden made his major speech on the crisis, opposing public opinion and the New England Trade and Fishery Bill, a speech often believed to have been drafted in collaboration with Benjamin Franklin for an American audience. Camden invoked John Locke's dictum that resistance to tyranny was justified and called the Bill:

... a bill of war; it draws the sword, and in its necessary consequences plunges the empire into civil and unnatural war ... My lords, it is evident that England must one day lose the dominion of America. It is impossible that this petty island can continue in dependence that mighty continent … To protract the time of separation to a distant day is all that can be hoped.

Thomas Hutchinson observed:

I never heard a greater flow of words, but my knowledge of facts in this controversy caused his misrepresentations and glosses to appear in a very strong light.

How Camden voted on the Quebec Act is unknown but in May 1775, and in response to a petition from a small number of settlers, he unsuccessfully moved its repeal. However, he seems to have been in the grip of a conspiracy theory that the Act's ulterior objective was to create an army of militant Roman Catholics in Canada to suppress the Protestant British colonists.

=== American War of Independence ===
The American War of Independence broke out in 1775 and Chatham's faction were dismayed. Their official line was to advocate mediation, refusing to think of either American independence or continued English hegemony. Camden continued to speak on the dilemma in parliament. He continued steadfastly to oppose the taxation of the American colonists, and signed, in 1778, the protest of the Lords in favour of an address to the King on the subject of the manifesto of the commissioners to America. In 1782 he was appointed Lord President of the Council under the Rockingham-Shelburne administration, supporting the government economic programme and anti-corruption drive, and championing repeal of the Declaratory Act 1720 in Ireland. Once Rockingham died in July, the Chathamite residue could only lose the Commons vote over the American peace terms the following February. Camden resigned and persuaded Shelburne to do the same.

=== The Younger Pitt ===
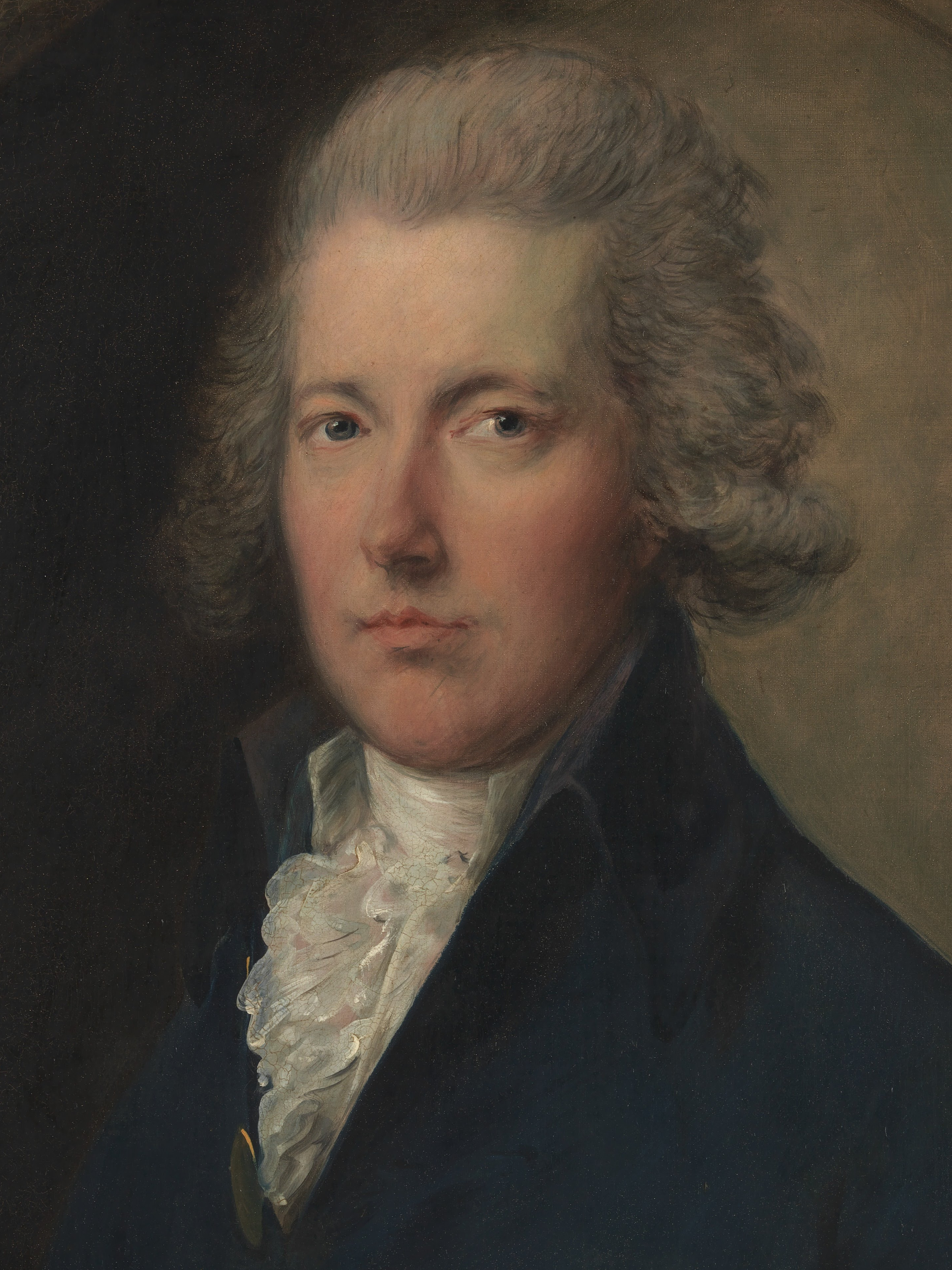
William Pitt the Younger

Camden was a leading opponent of the ensuing Fox-North Coalition, denouncing it for patronage and leading the opposition to Fox's East India Bill that brought down the administration on 9 December 1783. William Pitt the Younger, the son of his former patron, came to power and within a few months, Camden was reinstated as Lord President, holding the post until his death. He was created Earl Camden on 13 May 1786 and granted a further peerage as Viscount Bayham to lend his son a courtesy title.

Camden took an animated part in the debates on important public matters until within two years of his death, in particular supporting Pitt's 1785 Parliamentary Reform Bill and the Irish trade proposals that same year. Camden continued to attend cabinet meetings and, after he moved to Hill Street, Berkeley Square on account of his ill health, cabinet meetings were sometimes held at his home.

=== Regency crisis of 1788 ===
In November 1788, King George III fell ill and insanity was feared. Lord Chancellor Thurlow hesitated over what action to take, thereby precipitating the regency crisis of 1788. As Lord President, Camden led the Privy Council examination of the King's doctors' opinions. With Thurlow unwilling to lead the legislature, Camden grasped the challenge of inviting parliament to appoint a regent, in the face of the opposition's support for the automatic appointment of their ally the Prince of Wales. Camden's resolution that appointment rested with parliament was carried in the Lords by 99 votes to 66 on 23 December 1788. Moreover, on 22 January 1789, Camden's motion to appoint the Prince of Wales, but with restrictions in case of the King's recovery, was carried by 94 to 68 votes. The King recovered the following month before the Regency Bill contained the force of law.

=== Fox's Libel Act ===
To the last, Camden zealously defended his early views on the functions of juries, especially of their right to decide on all questions of libel. In the Lords debate on the second reading of the Libel Act 1792 (32 Geo. 3. c. 60) on 16 May, Camden contended that intention was an essential element of libel and should be decided by the jury as in murder cases. Broadening the legal argument to the constitutional and political Camden charged press freedom to the hands of the jury as the representatives of the people. The judges he held were too prone to government pressure to guarantee essential freedoms. Despite the unanimous opposition of the Law Lords, Camden's speech helped secure a majority of 57 to 32.

== Reputation and legacy ==
Camden was short in stature but of a fine physique. For recreation he enjoyed music, theatre, romantic fiction, conversation and food. His vices were sloth and gluttony rather than womanising or gambling. The Earl Camden died in London on 18 April 1794. His remains were interred in Seal church in Kent. Camden died a wealthy man, much of his wealth deriving from his wife. Both Lord Campbell and Sir William Holdsworth held Camden a great Lord Chancellor.

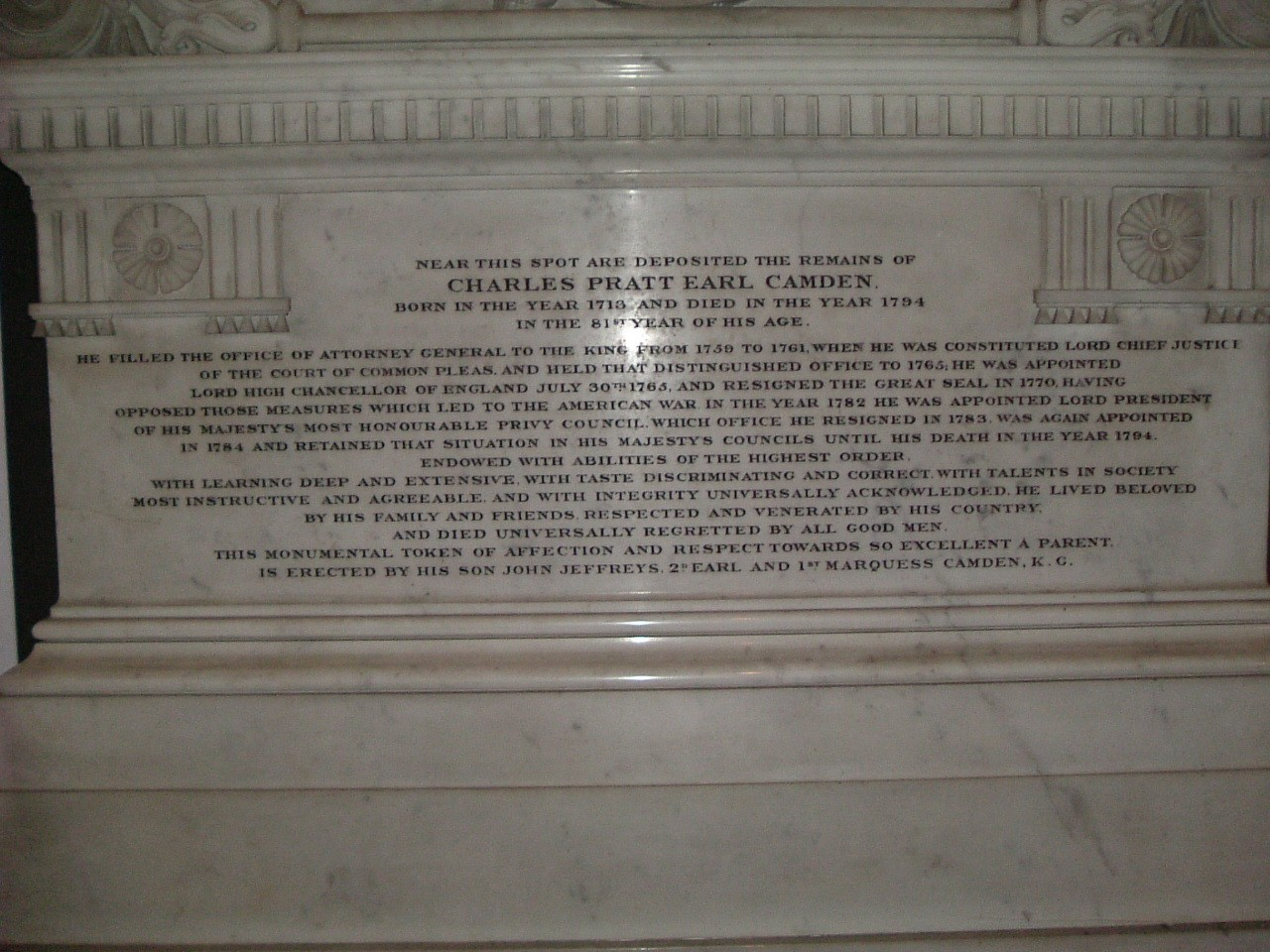
Charles Pratt's memorial stone

[Camden was] a great constitutional lawyer, a great legal historian, and a great common lawyer — a worthy successor, by virtue both of his learning and his principles, of such predecessors as Coke and Hale and Holt.

— Holdsworth

By the 20th century, Camden's legal opinions were seen as subservient to Chatham's politics and Camden certainly followed the party line on Wilkes and America. However, his party loyalty was tempered by a self-serving interest in power. He served under five prime ministers and on two occasions clung to office after Chatham had resigned.

In his last years, he took a great interest in the career of Robert Stewart, 2nd Marquess of Londonderry, his daughter's stepson. Camden, whose own son was not to prove much of a statesman, recognised young Robert's potential and treated him very much as though he was his actual grandson.

In 1788 he obtained an Act of Parliament granting permission to develop some fields he owned just to the north of London. In 1791 he laid out the land in plots and leased them for the construction of 1,400 houses, the beginnings of Camden Town.

The town of Camden, Maine in the United States, was named for him in 1791. This is one of several cities, towns, and counties bearing his name, including Camden, South Carolina, Camden, North Carolina, and Camden, New Jersey, as well as Camden Counties in New Jersey (of which the eponymous city is the seat and largest city), Missouri and Georgia. In turn, Camden, South Carolina gave its name both to the Battle of Camden and Camden, Alabama. Camden, Tennessee was named for the battle, and Camden, Arkansas took its name from the town in Alabama. Furthermore, Pratt Street, a major thoroughfare in Baltimore, is also named partially after him.

== Cases ==
- Chapman v Pickersgill (1762) 2 Wilson 145, 146, "I wish never to hear this objection again. This action is for a tort: torts are infinitely various; not limited or confined, for there is nothing in nature but may be an instrument of mischief".
- Entick v Carrington (1765) 19 Howell's State Trials 1030, right to security and property without arbitrary official interference
- Donaldson v Beckett 98 ER 257 (1774)

== Bibliography ==
- Campbell, J. L. (1851a) Life of Lord Chancellor Camden from his Birth till the Death of George II, Blanchard & Lea
- — (1851b) Continuation of the Life of Lord Chancellor Camden till he became and Ex-Chancellor, Blanchard & Lea
- Eeles, H. S. (1934) Lord Chancellor Camden and his Family
- Howell, T. B; Howell, T. J. (1828). General Index to the Collection of State Trials. Vol. Part I – Names. London: Hansard. pp. p.108. (Google Books)
- Rigg, J. M. (1896). "Pratt, Charles (1714-1794)". In Lee, Sidney (ed.). Dictionary of National Biography. Vol. 46. London: Smith, Elder & Co.
- Rose, M. (1988). "The author as proprietor: Donaldson v. Becket and the genealogy of modern authorship". Representations. 23: 51–85. doi:10.1525/rep.1988.23.1.99p0230p.
- Thomas, P. D. G. (2008) "Pratt, Charles, first Earl Camden (1714–1794)", Oxford Dictionary of National Biography, Oxford University Press, online edn, accessed 15 February 2008 (subscription, Wikipedia Library access or UK public library membership required)
- Towers, J. (1764). An Enquiry into the Question, whether Juries are, or are not, Judges of Law, as well as of Fact; with a particular Reference to the Case of Libels. London: J. Wilkie.

Parliament of Great Britain
Preceded by James Hayes; Edward Poore	Member of Parliament for Downton; 1757–1761; With: Edward Poore	Succeeded by Thomas Pym Hales; James Hayes
Legal offices
Preceded by Robert Henley	Attorney General for England and Wales; 1757–1762	Succeeded by Charles Yorke
Preceded by John Willes	Chief Justice of the Common Pleas; 1762–1766	Succeeded by John Eardley Wilmot
Political offices
Preceded by The Earl of Northington	Lord High Chancellor of Great Britain; 1766–1770	Succeeded by Charles Yorke
Preceded by The Earl Bathurst	Lord President of the Council; 1782–1783	Succeeded by The Viscount Stormont
Preceded by The Earl Gower	Lord President of the Council; 1784–1794	Succeeded by The Earl Fitzwilliam
Peerage of Great Britain
New creation	Earl Camden; 1786–1794	Succeeded by John Jeffreys Pratt
New creation	Baron Camden; 1765–1794	Succeeded by John Jeffreys Pratt
