= Thomas Howell =

Thomas Howell may refer to:

- Thomas Howell (merchant) (c.1480–1537), draper who bequeathed money to Howell's School, Denbigh
- Thomas Howell (poet) (fl. 1568), English poet
- Thomas Howell (bishop) (1588–1650), bishop of Bristol, 1644–1645
- Thomas Bayly Howell (1767–1815), English lawyer and writer who edited and lent his name to Howell's State Trials
- Thomas Jones Howell (1793–1858), son of Thomas Bayly Howell and co-editor of Howell's State Trials
- Thomas J. Howell (politician) (1830s–?), American state legislator in Missouri, possible eponym of Howell County
- Thomas J. Howell (botanist) (1842–1912), American botanist
- Tommy Howell, rugby league footballer who played in the 1890s and 1900s
- Thomas Raymond Howell (1924–2004), American ornithologist
- C. Thomas Howell (born 1966), American actor and film director
- Tom Howell (cricketer) (born 1987), English cricketer
- Thomas Howell (curler) (born 1994), American curler
- Tom Howell (high jumper) (born 1953), American high jumper, 1975 indoor All-American for the Rutgers Scarlet Knights track and field team
