= Constitutional law =

Law dealing with structure of a state

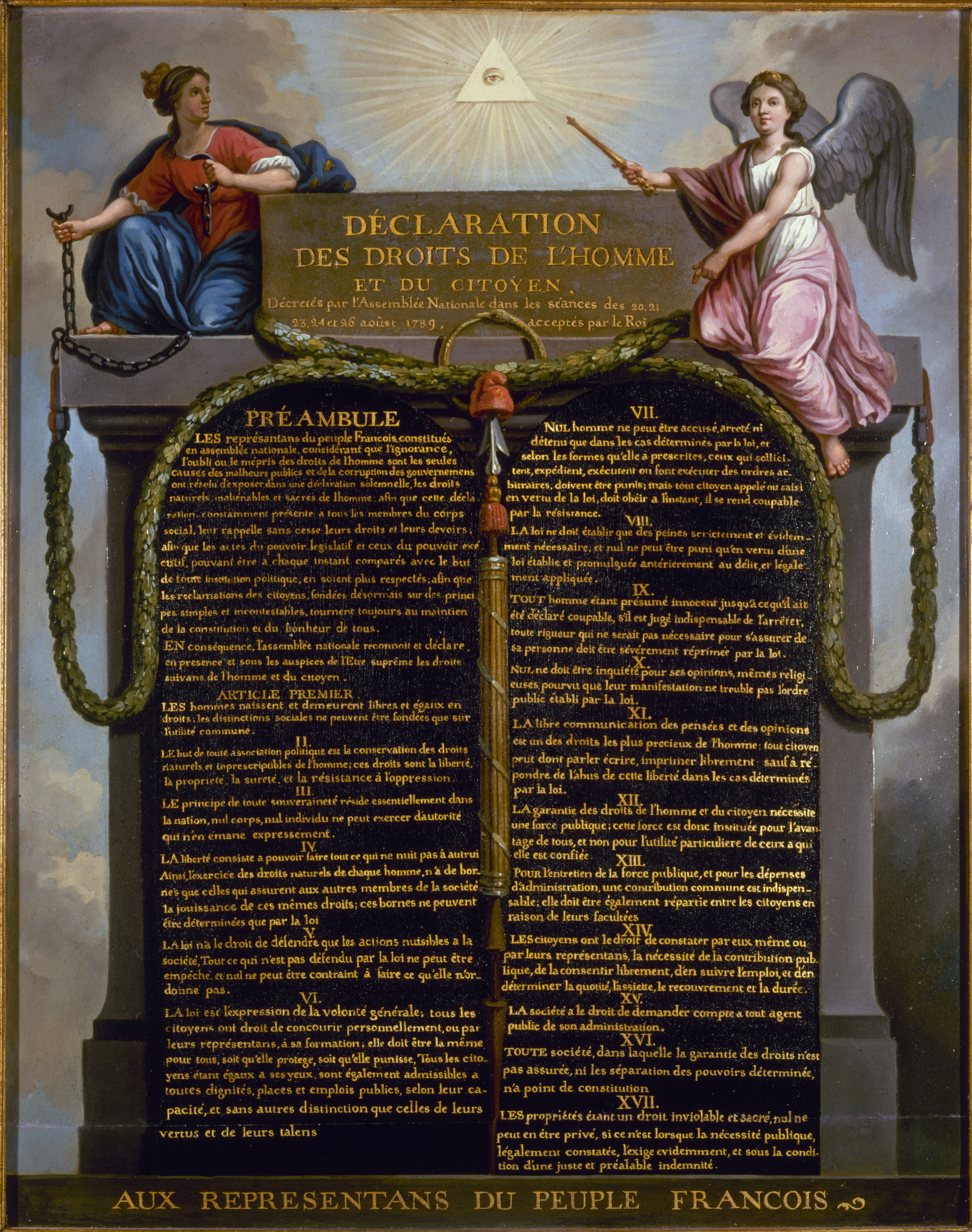
The principles from the French Declaration of the Rights of Man and of the Citizen still have constitutional importance.

Constitutional law is a body of law which defines the role, powers, and structure of different entities within a state, namely, the executive, the parliament or legislature, and the judiciary; as well as the basic rights of citizens and their relationship with their governments, and in federal countries such as the United States and Canada, the relationship between the central government and state, provincial, or territorial governments.

Not all nation states have codified constitutions, though all such states have a jus commune, or law of the land, that may consist of a variety of imperative and consensual rules. These may include customary law, conventions, statutory law, judge-made law, or international law. Constitutional law deals with the fundamental principles by which the government exercises its authority. In some instances, these principles grant specific powers to the government, such as the power to tax and spend for the welfare of the population. Other times, constitutional principles act to place limits on what the government can do, such as prohibiting the arrest of an individual without sufficient cause.

In most nations, such as the United States, India, and Singapore, constitutional law is based on the text of a document ratified at the time the nation came into being. Other constitutions, notably that of the United Kingdom, rely heavily on uncodified rules, as several legislative statutes and constitutional conventions, their status within constitutional law varies, and the terms of conventions are in some cases strongly contested.

== Legal structure ==
Constitutional laws can be considered second order rule making or rules about making rules to exercise power. It governs the relationships between the judiciary, the legislature and the executive with the bodies under its authority. One of the key tasks of constitutions within this context is to indicate hierarchies and relationships of power. For example, in a unitary state, the constitution will vest ultimate authority in one central administration and legislature, and judiciary, though there is often a delegation of power or authority to local or municipal authorities. When a constitution establishes a federal state for instance as seen in India, it will identify multiple levels of government coexisting with exclusive or shared areas of jurisdiction over lawmaking, application and enforcement. Some federal states, most notably the United States, have separate and parallel federal and state judiciaries, with each having its own hierarchy of courts with a supreme court for each state. India, on the other hand, has one judiciary divided into district courts, high courts, and the Supreme Court of India.

== Human rights ==
Human rights or civil liberties form a crucial part of a country's constitution and uphold the rights of the individual against the state. Most jurisdictions, like the United States and France, have a codified constitution, with a bill of rights. Canada is an example where the constitution is not codified, but includes the Canadian Charter of Rights and Freedoms to protect human rights for Canadian citizens and residents.

Some countries like the United Kingdom have no entrenched document setting out fundamental rights; in those jurisdictions the constitution is composed of statute, case law, convention and international agreements such as the European Convention on Human Rights. In the case of Entick v Carrington, judges derived constitutional principles from the common law. John Entick's house was searched and ransacked by Sheriff Carrington. Carrington argued that a warrant from a Government minister, the Earl of Halifax was valid authority, even though there was no statutory provision or court order for it. The court, led by Lord Camden stated that,

"The great end, for which men entered into society, was to secure their property. That right is preserved sacred and incommunicable in all instances, where it has not been taken away or abridged by some public law for the good of the whole. By the laws of England, every invasion of private property, be it ever so minute, is a trespass... If no excuse can be found or produced, the silence of the books is an authority against the defendant, and the plaintiff must have judgment."

The common law and the civil law jurisdictions do not share the same constitutional law underpinnings. Common law nations, such as those in the Commonwealth as well as the United States, derive their legal systems from that of the United Kingdom, and as such place greater emphasis on judicial precedent, whereby consequential court rulings (especially those by higher courts) are a source of law. Civil law jurisdictions, on the other hand, place less emphasis on case law and judicial review, and legislators have significantly more power to modify the law. As a result, the structure of the judiciary differs significantly between the two, with common law judicial processes often being adversarial compared to an inquisitorial approach which is more common in the civil law tradition. Common law judicatures consequently separate the judiciary from the prosecution, thereby establishing the courts as independent from both the legislature and law enforcement. Human rights law in these countries is as a result, largely built on legal precedent in the courts' interpretation of constitutional law, whereas that of civil law countries is almost exclusively composed of codified law, constitutional or otherwise.

There are also international enactments to protect human rights. One example is the Charter of Fundamental Rights of the European Union which was intended for inclusion in the Treaty of Lisbon. Perhaps the most important international example is the Universal Declaration of Human Rights under the UN Charter. These are intended to ensure basic political, social and economic standards that a nation state, or intergovernmental body is obliged to provide to its citizens but many do include its governments.

== Legislative procedure ==
Another main function of constitutions may be to describe the procedure by which parliaments may legislate. For instance, special majorities may be required to alter the constitution. In bicameral legislatures, there may be a process laid out for second or third readings of bills before a new law can enter into force. Alternatively, there may further be requirements for maximum terms that a government can keep power before holding an election.

== Study of constitutional law ==
Constitutional law is a major focus of legal studies and research. For example, most law students in the United States are required to take a class in Constitutional Law during their first year, and several law journals are devoted to the discussion of constitutional issues.

== The rule of law ==
The doctrine of the rule of law dictates that government must be conducted according to law. This was first established by British legal theorist A. V. Dicey.

Dicey identified three essential elements of the British Constitution which were indicative of the rule of law:

1. Absolute supremacy of regular law as opposed to the influence of arbitrary power;
2. Equality before the law;
3. The Constitution is a result of the ordinary law of the land.

Dicey's rule of law formula consists of three classic tenets. The first is that the regular law is supreme over arbitrary and discretionary powers. "[N]o man is punishable ... except for a distinct breach of the law established in the ordinary legal manner before the ordinary courts of the land."

The second is that all men are to stand equal in the eyes of the law. "...no man is above the law...every man, whatever be his rank or condition, is subject to the ordinary law of the realm and amenable to the jurisdiction of the ordinary tribunals"

The third is that the general ideas and principles that the constitution supports arise directly from the judgements and precedents issued by the judiciary. "We may say that the constitution is pervaded by the rule of law on the ground that the general principles of the constitution... are with us the result of judicial decisions determining the rights of private persons in particular cases brought before the courts"

== The separation of powers ==
Separation of powers is often regarded as a second limb functioning alongside the rule of law to curb the powers of the government. In many modern nation states, power is divided and vested into three branches of government: The legislature, the executive, and the judiciary are known as the horizontal separation of powers. The first and the second are harmonized in traditional Westminster system. Vertical separation of powers is decentralization.

== Election law ==
Election law is a subfield of constitutional law. It includes the rules governing the process of elections. These rules enable the translation of the will of the people into functioning democracies. Election law addresses issues who is entitled to vote, voter registration, ballot access, campaign finance and party funding, redistricting, apportionment, electronic voting and voting machines, accessibility of elections, election systems and formulas, vote counting, election disputes, referendums, and issues such as electoral fraud and electoral silence.

== See also ==
- Constitution
- Constitutional economics
- Constitutional review
- Constitutional rights
- Constitutionalism
- Monism and dualism in international law
- Philosophy of law
- Public law
- Rechtsstaat
- Rule of law
- Rule according to higher law
