= Henchy =

Henchy is a surname. Notable people with the surname include:

- Chris Henchy (born 1964), American screenwriter and film producer
- David O'Connor Henchy (1810–1876), Irish politician
- Edward Henchy (died c. 1895), American Catholic priest
- Florence Henchy (Florence Hensey, fl. 1748–1759), Irish-born French spy
- Séamus Henchy (1917–2009), Irish judge
