= Donald Serrell Thomas =

British crime writer (1934–2022)

Donald Serrell Thomas (18 July 1934 – 20 January 2022) was a British crime writer. His work primarily included Victorian-era historical, crime and detective fiction, as well as books on factual crime and criminals, in particular several academic books on the history of crime in London. He wrote a number of biographies, two volumes of poetry, and also edited volumes of poetry by John Dryden and the Pre-Raphaelites. He also wrote under the pseudonym Richard Manton.

== Biography ==
Donald Thomas was born in Weston-super-Mare, Somerset on 18 July 1934. He was educated at Queen's College, Taunton, before completing his National Service in the Royal Air Force (1953–1955) and then going up to Balliol College, Oxford (1955–1958). He held a personal chair as Professor Emeritus of English Literature at Cardiff University.

=== Early works ===
Thomas's earliest works seem to have been in the area of legal and historical fact, notably revised texts of Thomas Bayly Howell's collection of state trials, originally collected at the behest of William Cobbett and published between 1809 and 1826. Among his earliest forays into the world of fiction was Sergeant Verity and the Cracksman, 1974, published under the pseudonym Francis Selwyn. By the early 1980s, however, he had largely shed the Selwyn pseudonym (returning to it briefly in the late 1980s for some non-fiction works, and once in 2000, for another "Verity" novel), and began writing under his own name, Donald (S.) Thomas, switching from academic study and biography to Sherlockiana and crime fiction, all underpinned with his deep knowledge of the times and cultures of which he writes.

=== Biographies and fact ===
He wrote a number of books, mostly novels, on a variety of subjects predominantly set in Victorian England. He also wrote a small number of non-fiction works dealing with similar subjects/settings, among them a study of the Victorian underworld, and biographies of Robert Browning, the Marquis de Sade, Henry Fielding, and Lewis Carroll.

His 1978 (rev. ed. 2001) biography of Admiral Thomas Cochrane, 10th Earl of Dundonald highlights the characteristics of that individual which served in large part as inspiration both for C. S. Forester's Horatio Hornblower, and for Patrick O'Brian's Jack Aubrey. In 1994, his Hanged in Error? provided an overview/investigation as to the likely guilt of seven individuals all hanged in the UK before its abolition as a means of capital punishment in 1965. The book dealt with the cases of Timothy Evans, John Williams (alias George MacKay, hanged in 1913 for the fatal shooting of Inspector Arthur Walls in Eastbourne during a burglary attempt), Edith Thompson, Robert Hoolhouse, Neville Heath, Charles Jenkins and James Hanratty. (Note: This is not the same as the similarly titled 1961 book Hanged in Error by Leslie Hale, which contains a different set of case histories.)

In academic circles, he is especially well known for his studies of the criminal underworld of London from Victorian times, through World War II to the Kray twins. He wrote seven biographies and a handful of other biographical studies, as well as fictionalised biographies of individuals such as Bonnie Prince Charlie. His biography of Lewis Carroll is recommended by Representative Poetry Online, and his other biographical works can be found on many academic reading lists.

He edited volumes of Everyman's Library on poets ranging from John Dryden to the Post-Romantics, and also offered a translation of Michel Millot and Jean L'Ange's bawdy 17th century novel L'École des filles, which is described as "both an uninhibited manual of sexual technique and an erotic masterpiece of the first order" on its back cover.

=== Fiction ===
In fiction terms, he is perhaps best known for his more recent works, in particular a series of Sherlock Holmes pastiches, beginning with 1997's The Secret Cases of Sherlock Holmes. He has also written a number of other titles, and three series featuring the main characters of:

Alfred Swain, an inspector of Scotland Yard.
Sonny Tarrant, a "gangland capo", and
Sgt. William Clarence Verity, a "Sergeant in Scotland Yard's 'Private Clothes Detail'" who investigates the Victorian criminal underground of London, c.1850.

(Verity was created under the pseudonym Francis Selwyn.) His other novels include The Raising of Lizzie Meek, "based on the scandals surrounding the Victorian miracle-worker Father Ignatius of Capel-y-ffin". Thomas is represented by Bill Hamilton of A.M. Heath & Company, Ltd.

=== Later life and death ===
Having retired from Cardiff University, he remained affiliated there, as an Associate Research Professor in the School of English, Communication and Philosophy. In 2005, as Personal Chair in the School of English, Communication and Philosophy at Cardiff University, he "donated a selection of his personal archive of research papers, used in writing his series of acclaimed books on the Underworld in Victorian and World War II eras to the University [of Cardiff]'s Special Collections and Archives."

Some of his last works included a study on censorship in modern Britain, reviewed as "provocative, timely and disturbing" by Iain Finlayson in The Times.

Thomas died on 20 January 2022, at the age of 87.

== Awards and nominations ==
As a poet, Thomas won the Eric Gregory Award in 1962 for his collection Points of Contact. His biography of Robert Browning A Life Within Life was a runner-up for the Whitbread Prize, and his Victorian Underworld was shortlisted for the Gold Dagger Award.

== Partial bibliography ==
=== As Francis Selwyn ===
==== Fiction ====
===== Sgt. Verity =====
- Sergeant Verity and the Imperial Diamond (André Deutsch 1975) ISBN 0-233-96704-4
  - (Stein and Day 1976) ISBN 0-8128-1917-9
- Sergeant Verity and the Cracksman (André Deutsch 1974) ISBN 0-233-96599-8
  - (Futura 1975) ISBN 0-86007-252-5
  - Cracksman on Velvet (Stein and Day 1974) ISBN 0-8128-1729-X
- Sergeant Verity Presents His Compliments (André Deutsch 1977) ISBN 0-233-96806-7
  - (Stein and Day 1977)
- Sergeant Verity and the Blood Royal (André Deutsch 1979) ISBN 0-233-97074-6
  - (Stein and Day 1979) ISBN 0-8128-2608-6
- Sergeant Verity and the Swell Mob (André Deutsch 1980) ISBN 0-233-97217-X
  - (Stein and Day 1981) ISBN 0-8128-2727-9
- The Hangman's Child (Robert Hale 2000) ISBN 0-7090-6683-X

===== Other? =====
- Villa Rosa (Blue Moon/Lyle Stuart 1989) ISBN 0-8216-5038-6

==== Non-fiction ====
- Hitler's Englishman: The Crime of Lord Haw-Haw (Routledge and Kegan Paul 1987) ISBN 0-7102-1032-9
  - (Penguin Books 1993) ISBN 0-14-014833-7
- Rotten to the Core?: The Life and Death of Neville Heath (Routledge and Kegan Paul 1988) ISBN 0-7102-1033-7
- Gangland: The Case of Bentley and Craig (Routledge 1988) ISBN 0-7102-1034-5
  - Nothing But Revenge: The Case of Bentley And Craig (Penguin 1991) ISBN 0-14-014832-9

=== As Donald (Serrell) Thomas ===
==== Poetry ====
- Points of Contact: a collection of poems, 1958–1961 65pp. (Routledge and Kegan Paul 1963)
- Welcome to the Grand Hotel 68pp. (Routledge and Kegan Paul 1975, 2006) ISBN 0-7100-8104-9

==== Fiction ====
===== Alfred Swain =====
- Belladonna: A Lewis Carroll Nightmare (Macmillan 1984) ISBN 0-333-36048-6
  - Mad Hatter Summer (Viking Press 1983) ISBN 0-670-44526-6
  - Belladonna (Papermac 1988) ISBN 0-333-46627-6
- Jekyll, Alias Hyde: A Variation (Macmillan 1988) ISBN 0-333-45782-X
  - (St. Martin's Press 1988) ISBN 0-312-02592-0
- The Ripper's Apprentice (Macmillan 1986) ISBN 0-333-40850-0
  - (St. Martin's Press 1989) ISBN 0-312-03420-2
- The Arrest of Scotland Yard (Macmillan 1993) ISBN 0-333-60506-3

===== Sonny Tarrant =====
- Dancing in the Dark (Macmillan 1992) ISBN 0-333-58718-9
  - (St. Martin's Press 1994) ISBN 0-312-10447-2
- Red Flowers for Lady Blue (Macmillan 2000) ISBN 0-333-78154-6
  - (Pan Books 2001) ISBN 0-330-39252-2

===== Sherlock Holmes =====
- The Secret Cases of Sherlock Holmes (Macmillan 1997) ISBN 0-330-36977-6
- Sherlock Holmes and the Running Noose (Macmillan 2001) ISBN 0-333-90522-9 (UK edition of Sherlock Holmes and the Voice from the Crypt, see below)
  - Sherlock Holmes and the Voice from the Crypt (Carroll & Graf 2002) ISBN 0-7867-0973-1 (US edition of Sherlock Holmes and the Running Noose, see above)
- The Execution of Sherlock Holmes (Pegasus 2007) ISBN 1-933648-22-8
- Sherlock Holmes and the King's Evil (Pegasus 2009) ISBN 1-60598-043-9
- Sherlock Holmes and the Ghosts of Bly (Pegasus 2010) ISBN 1-60598-134-6
- The Lost Casebooks of Sherlock Holmes (Pegasus 2012) ISBN 978-1-60598-352-3
  - (Omnibus of The Secret Cases of Sherlock Holmes, Sherlock Holmes and the Voice from the Crypt, & The Execution of Sherlock Holmes)
- Death on a Pale Horse: Sherlock Holmes on Her Majesty's Secret Service (Pegasus, March 2013) ISBN 1-60598-394-2

===== Other =====
- Summer in the Country (The Odyssey Press, 1968)
- Prince Charlie's Bluff (Macmillan 1974) ISBN 0-333-15042-2
- Flight of the Eagle (Macmillan 1975, 2006) ISBN 0-333-18087-9
  - (Viking Press 1976) ISBN 0-670-31830-2
- The Blindfold Game (André Deutsch 1981) ISBN 0-233-97366-4
- Captain Wunder (Viking Books/Penguin 1981) ISBN 0-670-20355-6
- The Day the Sun Rose Twice (1985)
- Honour among Thieves (Weidenfeld & Nicolson 1991) ISBN 0-297-81205-X
- Dead Giveaway (1993)
- The Raising of Lizzie Meek (Robert Hale 1993) ISBN 0-7090-5031-3

==== Non-fiction & reference ====
- A Long Time Burning: The History of Literary Censorship in England (Praeger 1969)
- State Trials, Vol. 1: Treason and libel, with Thomas Bayly Howell (Routledge & Kegan Paul 1972) ISBN 0-7100-7325-9
- State Trials, Vol 2: The Public Conscience, with Thomas Bayly Howell (Routledge & Kegan Paul 1972) ISBN 0-7100-7326-7
- Charge! hurrah! hurrah!: A Life of Cardigan of Balaclava (Viking Press 1975) ISBN 0-670-20388-2
  - Cardigan: The Hero of Balaclava (Routledge & Kegan Paul 1987) ISBN 0-7102-1205-4
  - (rev. ed. Weidenfeld Military/Cassell Military/Viking Press 2002) ISBN 0-304-35824-X
- Cochrane: Britannia's Sea Wolf (1975)
  - Cochrane: Britannia's Last Sea-King (Viking Press 1978) ISBN 0-670-22644-0
- The Marquis de Sade: A New Biography (New York Graphic Society 1976) ISBN 0-8212-0653-2
  - (Little, Brown & Company 1977) ISBN 0-8212-0653-2
  - fr. Le Marquis de Sade (Seghers 1977)
  - de. Marquis de Sade: die grosse Biographie (Blanvalet 1978)
- Swinburne, the Poet in his World (Weidenfeld and Nicolson 1979; OUP 1979) ISBN 0-297-77605-3 ; ISBN 0-19-520136-1
  - (Allison & Busby 1999) ISBN 0-7490-0409-6
  - (Häftad. Ivan R. Dee Publisher, 1999) ISBN 1-56663-229-3
- Robert Browning: A life within life (Weidenfeld and Nicolson 1982, 1989) ISBN 0-297-78092-1 ; ISBN 0-297-79639-9
  - (Viking Books 1983) ISBN 0-670-60090-3
- Henry Fielding (1990) (St. Martin's Press 1991) ISBN 0-312-05443-2
- Dead Giveaway: Murderers Avenged from the Grave (M. O'Mara Bks. 1993) ISBN 1-85479-930-4
- Hanged in Error? (Robert Hale 1994) ISBN 0-7090-5357-6
- Lewis Carroll: A Portrait With Background (John Murray 1996) ISBN 0-7195-5323-7
  - (Barnes & Noble Books 1999) ISBN 0-7607-1232-8
- The Victorian Underworld, with Henry Mayhew (New York University Press 1998) ISBN 0-8147-8238-8
- An underworld at war : spivs, deserters, racketeers & civilians in the Second World War (John Murray, 2003) ISBN 0-7195-6340-2
  - The Enemy Within: Hucksters, Racketeers, Deserters, & Civilians During the Second World War (New York University Press 2004) ISBN 0-8147-8286-8
- Villains' Paradise: A History of Britain's Post-War Underworld: From the spivs to the Krays (John Murray 2006) ISBN 0-7195-6344-5
  - (Pegasus 2006) ISBN 1-933648-17-1
- Freedom's Frontier: Censorship in Modern Britain (John Murray 2007) ISBN 0-7195-5733-X
- Naval Battles of Crete (André Deutsch)

===== As editor =====
- Selected Poems by John Dryden (J.M. Dent/C.E. Tuttle Everyman's Library 1993) ISBN 0-460-87230-3
- The Everyman Book of Victorian Verse: The Pre-Raphaelites to the Nineties (J.M. Dent/C.E. Tuttle 1993) ISBN 0-460-87310-5
- The Everyman Book of Victorian Verse: The Post-Romantics (Routledge 1990, 1994) ISBN 0-415-00888-3
  - (J.M. Dent/C.E. Tuttle 1994) ISBN 0-460-87526-4

===== As translator =====
- The School of Venus (orig: L'École des filles, ou la Philosophie des dames) by Michel Millot et Jean L'Ange (New American Library 1971)
  - (Panther 1972) ISBN 0-586-03674-1
