= Entick v Carrington =

1765 English (United Kingdom) case law

- Court: King's Bench
- Full case name: John Entick, (Clerk) v Nathan Carrington and Three Others
- Decided: 2 November 1765
- Citations: [1765] EWHC J98 (KB), (1765) 19 Howell's State Trials 1029; 95 ER 807

Court membership
- Judges sitting: Lord Camden, Chief Justice of the Common Pleas

Case opinions
- Camden CJ

Entick v Carrington [1765] EWHC KB J98 is a leading case in English law and UK constitutional law establishing the civil liberties of individuals and limiting the scope of executive power. The case has also been influential in other common law jurisdictions and was an important motivation for the Fourth Amendment to the United States Constitution. It is famous for the dictum of Lord Camden: "If it is law, it will be found in our books." (Note: As reported in Howell's State Trials. Lord Camden's words as recorded in Mr. Serjeant Wilson's Reports were "If this is law it would be found in our books, but no such law ever existed in this country.")

== Facts ==
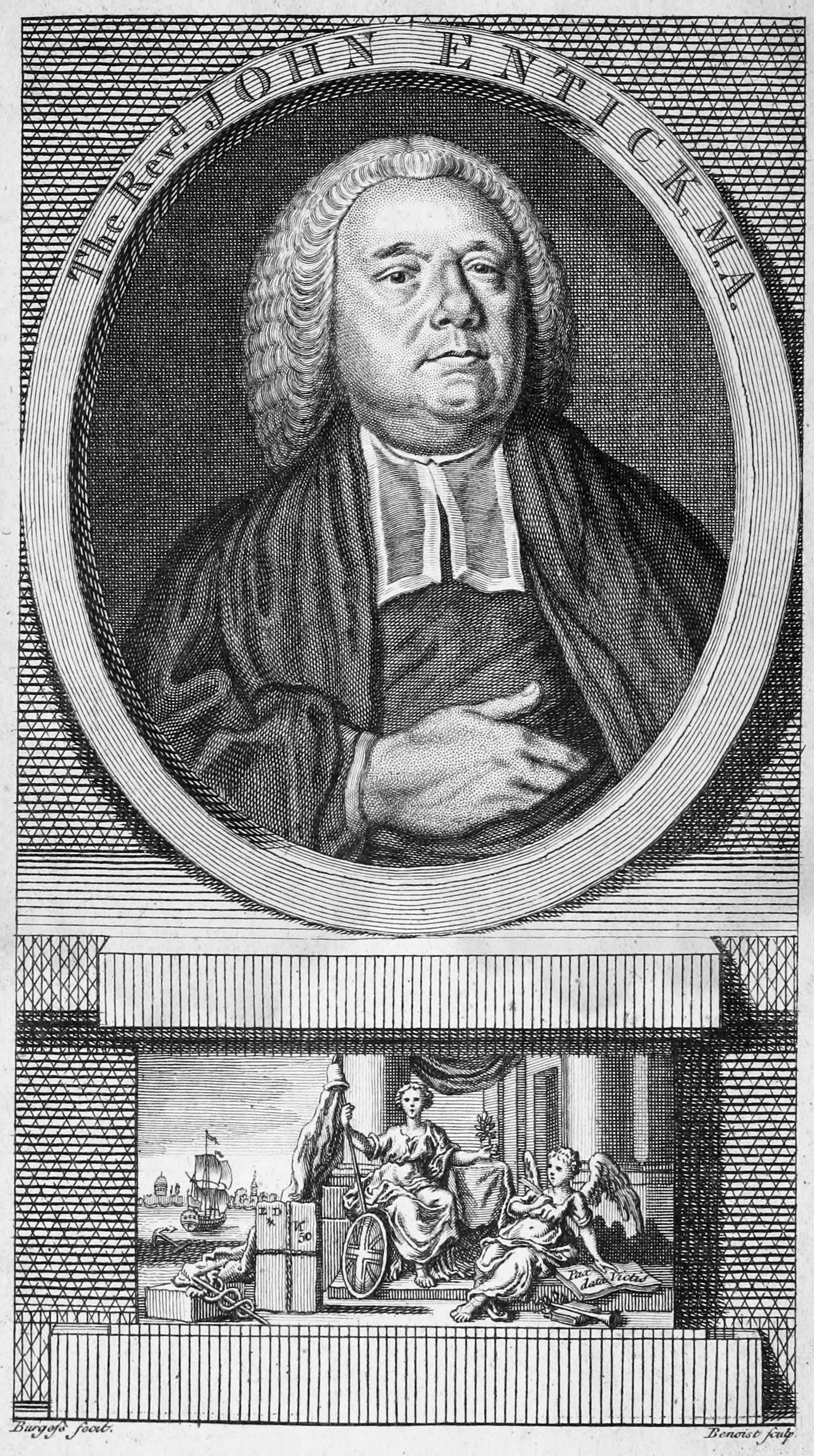
John Entick

On 11 November 1762, the King's Chief Messenger, Nathan Carrington, and three other King's messengers, James Watson, Thomas Ardran, and Robert Blackmore, broke into the home of the Grub Street writer John Entick (c. 1703 – 1773) in the parish of St Dunstan, Stepney "with force and arms". Over the course of four hours, they broke open locks and doors and searched all of the rooms before taking away 100 charts and 100 pamphlets, causing £2,000 of damage (equivalent to £355,521 in 2025). The King's messengers were acting on the orders of Lord Halifax, newly appointed Secretary of State for the Northern Department, "to make strict and diligent search for ... the author, or one concerned in the writing of several weekly very seditious papers entitled, The Monitor, or British Freeholder".

Entick sued the messengers for trespassing on his land.

== Judgment ==
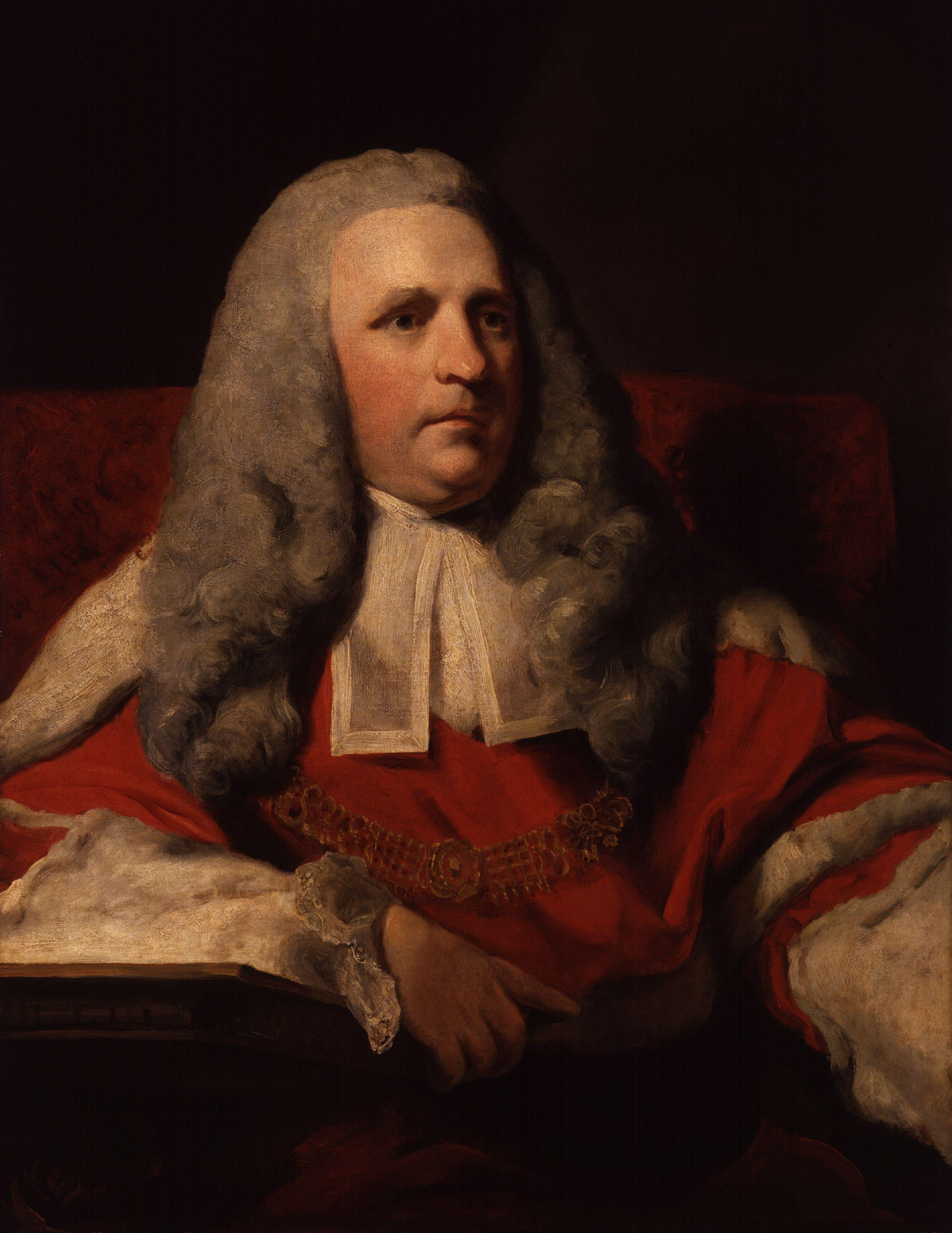
Lord Camden

The trial took place in Westminster Hall presided over by Lord Camden, the Chief Justice of the Common Pleas. Carrington and his colleagues claimed that they acted on Halifax's warrant, which gave them legal authority to search Entick's home; they therefore could not be liable for the tort. However, Camden held that Halifax had no right under statute or under precedent to issue such a warrant and therefore found in Entick's favour. In the most famous passage Camden stated:

The great end, for which men entered into society, was to secure their property. That right is preserved sacred and incommunicable in all instances, where it has not been taken away or abridged by some public law for the good of the whole. The cases where this right of property is set aside by private law, are various. Distresses, executions, forfeitures, taxes etc are all of this description; wherein every man by common consent gives up that right, for the sake of justice and the general good. By the laws of England, every invasion of private property, be it ever so minute, is a trespass. No man can set his foot upon my ground without my licence, but he is liable to an action, though the damage be nothing; which is proved by every declaration in trespass, where the defendant is called upon to answer for bruising the grass and even treading upon the soil. If he admits the fact, he is bound to show by way of justification, that some positive law has empowered or excused him. The justification is submitted by the judges, who are to look into the books; and if such a justification can be maintained by the text of the statute law, or by the principles of common law. If no excuse can be found or produced, the silence of the books is an authority against the defendant, and the plaintiff must have judgment.

Hence Lord Camden ruled, as later became viewed as a general principle, that the state may do nothing but that which is expressly authorised by law, while the individual may do anything but that which is forbidden by law.

== Significance ==
The judgment established the limits of executive power in English law: the state may act lawfully only in a manner prescribed by statute or common law.

It was also part of the background to the Fourth Amendment to the United States Constitution and was described by the Supreme Court of the United States as "a 'great judgment', 'one of the landmarks of English liberty', 'one of the permanent monuments of the British Constitution', and a guide to an understanding of what the Framers meant in writing the Fourth Amendment".

== See also ==
- Everything which is not forbidden is allowed
