= John Shebbeare =

British political satirist (1709–1788)

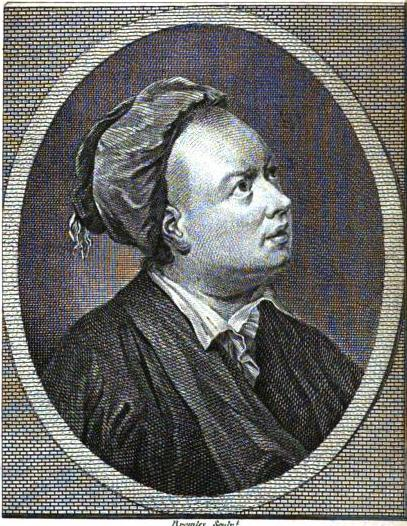
- Born: 1709; Bideford, Devonshire, England
- Died: 1 August 1788 (aged 78–79); Pimlico, London, England
- Occupation: Writer
- Spouse: Susanna
- Writing career
- Genre: Political satire

John Shebbeare (1709 – 1 August 1788) was a British Tory political satirist.

== Life ==
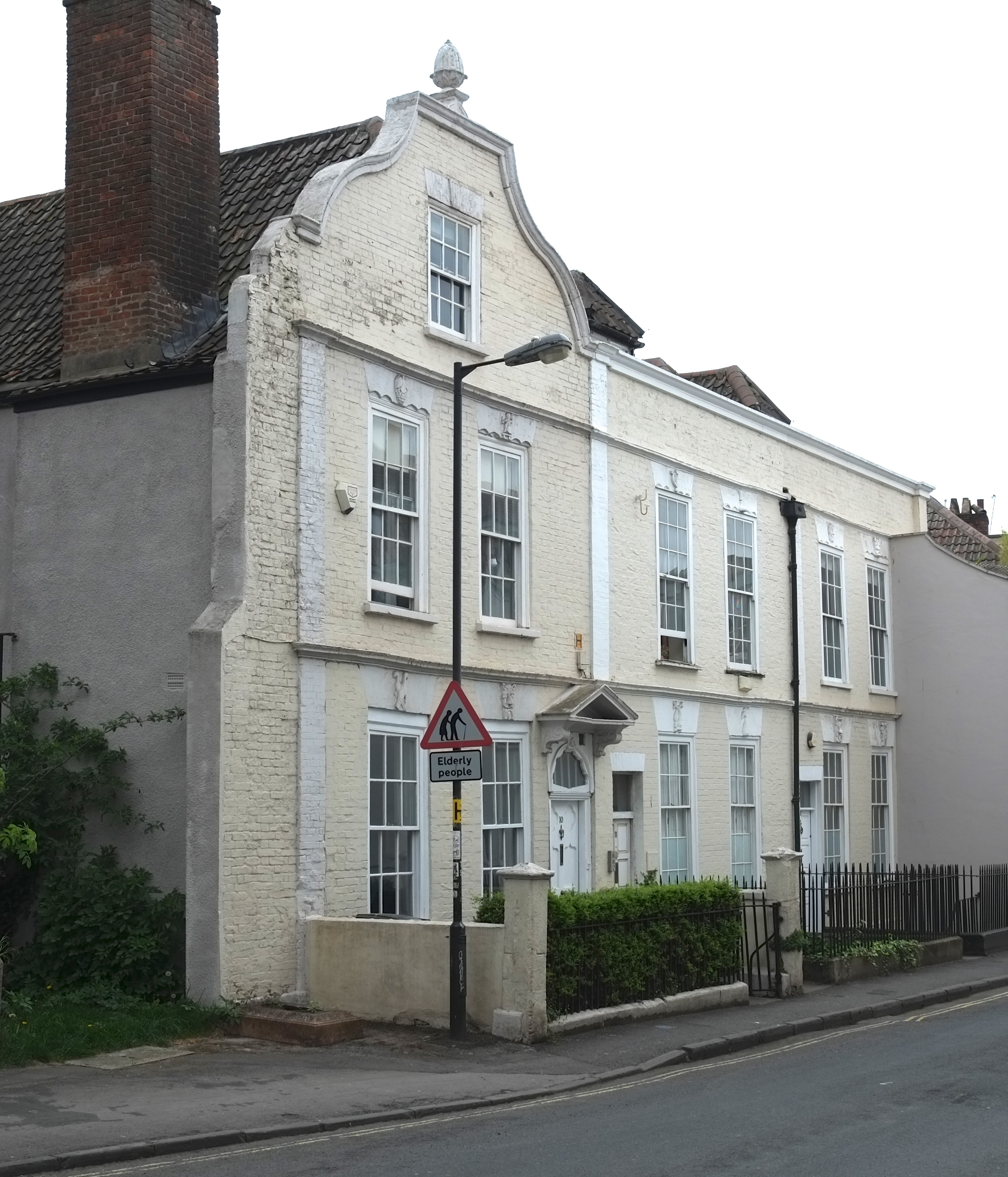
10 Guinea Street (nearest to camera), seen in 2020

Born 1709, he was the eldest son of an attorney and corn-factor of Bideford, Devonshire. A hundred and a village in Devon, where the family had owned land, bear their name. Shebbeare was educated at the free school, Exeter, under Zachariah Mudge, and there, it is said, "gave evidence of his future eminence in misanthropy and literature." In his sixteenth year he was apprenticed to a surgeon, and afterwards set up for himself. Having, however, lampooned both his master and the members of the Exeter corporation, he in 1736 removed to Bristol, where in 1750 he was listed in land tax records as being at 10, Guinea Street, a house which is extant. He entered into partnership with a chemist in the city. In 1740, he published A new Analysis of the Bristol Waters; together with the Cause of Diabetes and Hectic, and their Cure, as it results from those Waters, which was reissued in 1760. The Shebbeare family had left Guinea Street by 1751.

In 1752, he went to Paris, where he claimed to have obtained a medical degree, and to have been elected member of the Academy of Sciences. But he found his pen more remunerative than his practice. Settling in London, he began his career as a political writer in 1754, with The Marriage Act, a novel, dedicated to John Russell, 4th Duke of Bedford, one of the chief opponents of Lord Hardwicke's reform. The author was imprisoned for his reflections on the legislature, but his book was reissued in 1755 as Matrimony, and reappeared in 1766. Shebbeare followed up his success in 1756 by an attack on the Duke of Newcastle in the form of Letters on the English Nation, by Batista Angeloni, a Jesuit resident in London, of which he professed to be the translator only. This political satire, modelled on Bolingbroke's writings against Robert Walpole, alone entitled Shebbeare (in the opinion of Boswell) to a respectable name in literature. Meanwhile, he attacked the ministry directly in the Monitor and the Con-test, as well as in a series of outspoken pamphlets entitled Letters to the People of England, having, it was said, determined to write himself into a post or into the pillory.

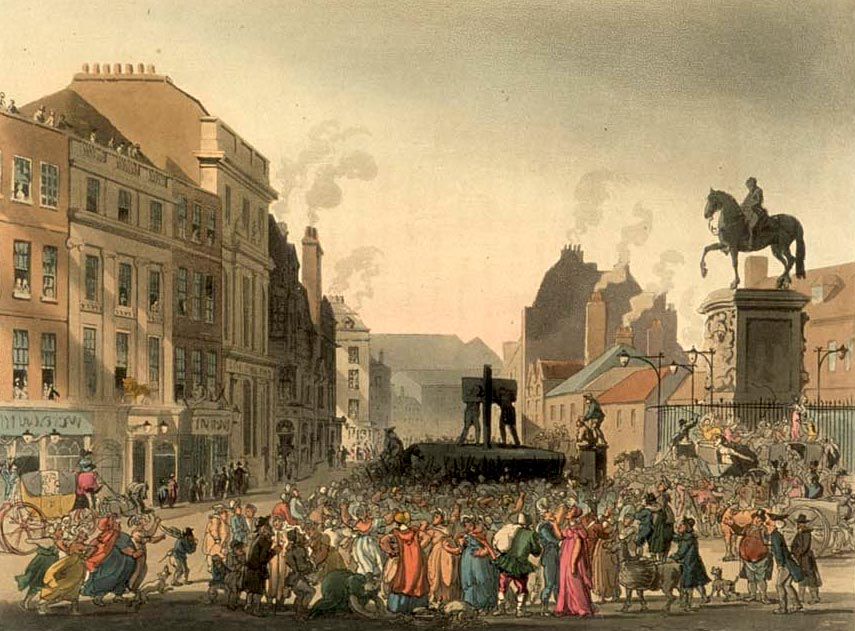
The Pillory at Charing Cross

At the close of 1757, after Pitt's dismissal, Shebbeare issued his sixth letter, "in which is shown that the present grandeur of France and calamities of this nation are owing to the influence of Hanover on the councils of England." On 12 January 1758, a general warrant was issued against the author, printer, and publisher. On 23 January all copies of a seventh Letter were seized and suppressed. On 17 June, Shebbeare was tried for libel on an information laid against him by the attorney-general, Pratt, who on this occasion admitted the right of the jury to judge of the law. During the trial, as Walpole laments, Mansfield laid it down that satires on dead kings were punishable. In summing up he declared that the Letter nearly approached high treason. On 28 November, Shebbeare was sentenced to a £5 fine and three years' imprisonment in King's Bench Prison, as well as having to pay a bond of £500 and find two £250 sureties for good behaviour for seven years on his release. He was also to stand in the pillory at Charing Cross on 5 December. Owing to the friendship of Arthur Beardmore, the under-sheriff, he was allowed to stand upright between the upper and lower boards of the pillory, while an Irish chairman held an umbrella over his head. At the end of an hour he retired amidst the cheers of the crowd, who had been invited by printed bills to come and see 'the British champion.' Beardmore was afterwards punished for his conduct. An anonymous squib appeared under the title Memoirs of the Pillory; being a consolatory Epistle to Dr. Shebbeare. While in prison Shebbeare received subscriptions for a history of England, and actually composed one volume, which was not published. When attacked on the subject in a letter in the Public Advertiser of 10 Aug. 1774 he excused himself chiefly on the ground of debts incurred in consequence of a lawsuit against Francis Gwyn, who had been concerned with him in the publication of an edition of Clarendon's History of the Reign of Charles II. The book, for which Shebbeare wrote a strong tory introduction, was suppressed by an injunction in chancery at the instance of the Duchess of Queensberry, and, though Shebbeare recovered expenses from Gwyn, half the sum went in costs. Notwithstanding his position, he refused to avail himself of the Insolvent Act. On his release he advocated peace with France, and attacked John Wilkes. On 29 Feb. 1764 a memorial signed by several members of parliament was presented to George Grenville in his favour, and Shebbeare was granted a pension of £200 a year. The king, in reply to Sir John Philips, who made the application, is said to have spoken of Shebbeare "in very favourable terms." Almon's statement that a pension of £400 had been previously granted by Bute seems doubtful. Henceforth Shebbeare became a steady advocate of the measures of the court, and even assailed his old favourite, Pitt.

His most elaborately written work was The History of the Excellence and Decline of the Institutions, Religion, Laws, Manners, and Genius of the Sumatrans, and of the Restoration thereof in the reign of Amurath the Third, 2 vols. 1763. It is a skilful exposure of the weak points in whig policy and administration, followed by a panegyric on George III and his ministers. In style it is a colourable imitation of Bolingbroke.

On 3 August 1764, Walpole sent Lord Hertford a pamphlet written by Shebbeare under Grenville's direction, adding the remark, "We do not ransack Newgate and the pillory for writers." He speaks of him as engaged with Carteret Webbe, solicitor to the treasury, in writing against Pratt, the lord chief justice, in a paper called The Moderator. In 1766 Shebbeare offered to John Beard, the manager of Covent Garden, a play he had written in early life, and its non-production led to the publication of the correspondence between them (1767). In 1768 he wrote for three months the reviews of books in the Political Register. In 1770 Shebbeare published an Eighth Letter to the People of England. He defended the American policy of George III against Richard Price and Edmund Burke in the Public Advertiser and elsewhere. The former he "abused daily in the papers".

In 1774, in reflecting on some speeches lately delivered by Thomas Townshend (afterwards Lord Sydney) and Councillor Lee, he took occasion to cast aspersions on the character and reputation of William III, Algernon Sidney, and other Whig heroes, as viewed in the light of the recently published Memorials of Sir John Dalrymple. An answer appeared as an appendix to a Letter to Dr. Johnson on his late Political Publications, 1775, by a "Doctor of Laws" (Hugh Baillie). Despite a protest made by Fox in the House of Commons on 16 Feb. 1774, the names of Johnson and Shebbeare were usually coupled in whig pasquinades. It was said that the king had pensioned both a He-bear and a She-bear. In 1776 Wilkes spoke of them as the "two famous doctors" who were "the state hirelings called pensioners" and whose names disgraced the civil list." William Mason the poet, writing under the pseudonym "Malcolm Macgregor," in 1777 addressed a scathing Epistle to Shebbeare, as:

The same abusive, base, abandoned thing
When pilloried or pensioned by a king

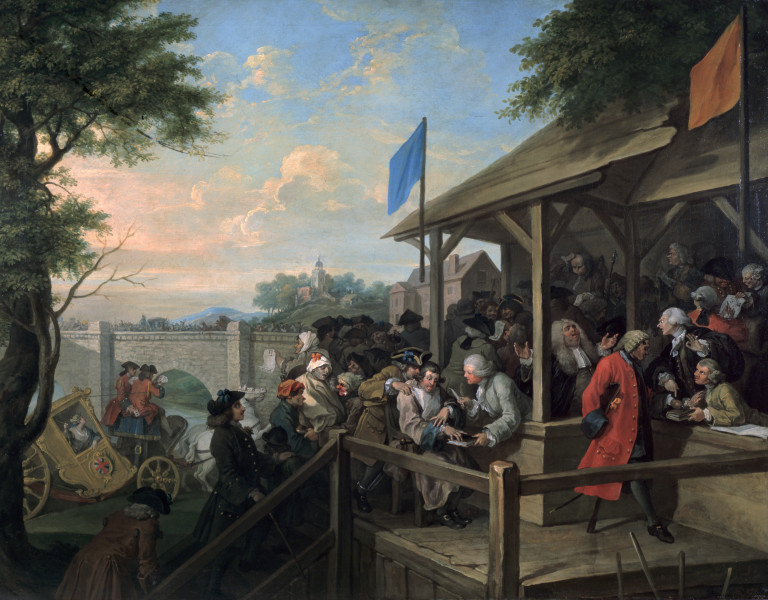
The Polling, The Humours of an Election series, 1755

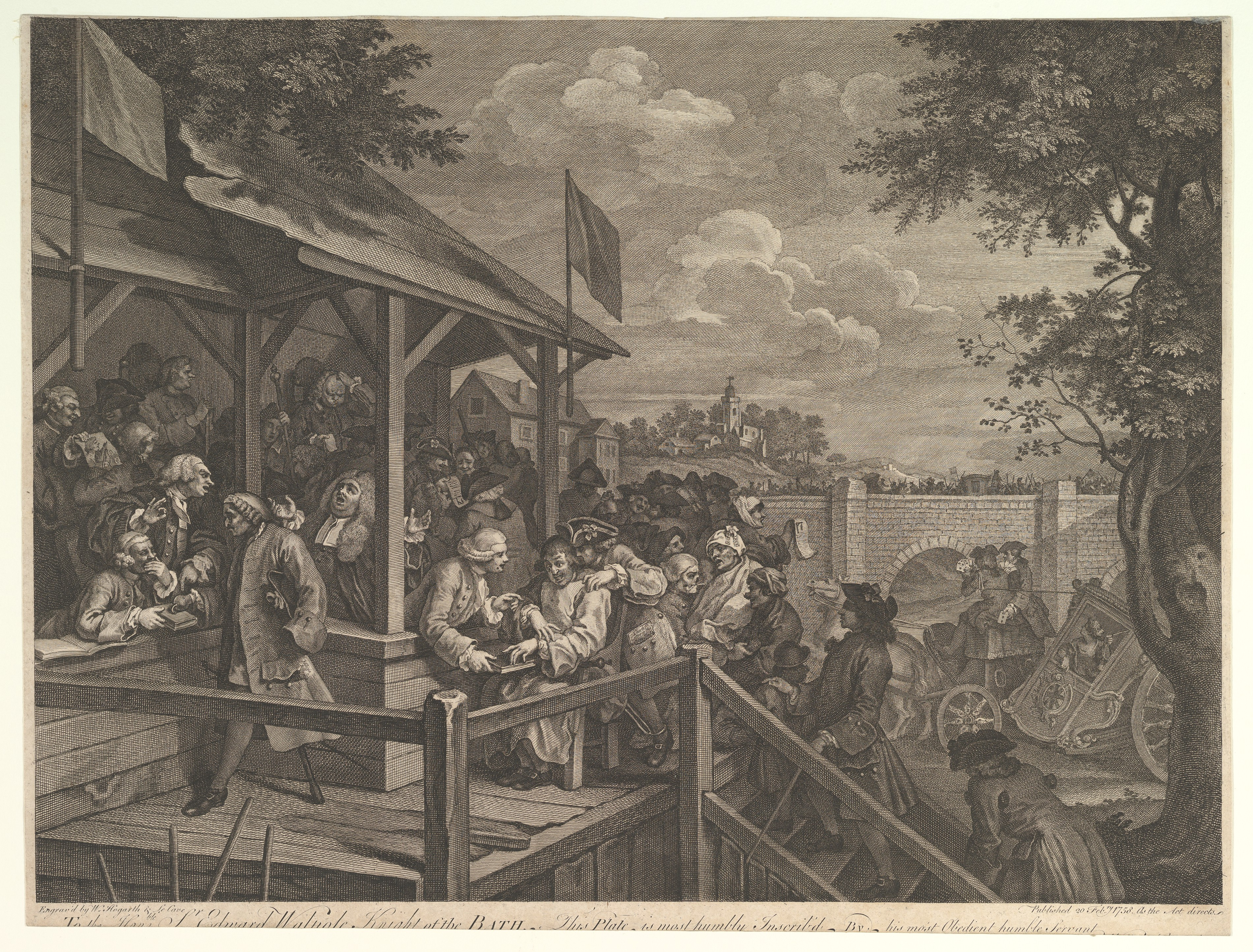
Print of The Polling, with the Sixth Letter in Shebbeare's pocket

Nor did Shebbeare's own political friends altogether spare him. His sudden transition from pillory to pension was glanced at in The Expedition of Humphry Clinker, and he is the "Ferret" of Tobias Smollett's Adventures of Sir Launcelot Greaves. Shebbeare seems to have shared Johnson's dislike to Scotsmen. He criticised adversely Smollet's History, and assailed the "Scotch gentlemen criticks" of the Critical Review, then conducted by Smollett. In the revised edition of the History, however, the passage relating to Shebbeare's prosecution in 1758 is curiously laudatory. William Hogarth, also one of George III's pensioners, introduced Shebbeare as one of the figures in The Polling, the third work of his four-part Humours of an Election series (he is seen, a shackle on his leg, whispering into the ear of a mad man; in the later print version, he has a copy of the Sixth Letter in his pocket.). Frances Burney met him in 1774 at the house of Catherine Reid, a Scottish portrait-painter, and has recorded a specimen of his conversation in her Early Diary. It was marked by extraordinary coarseness, and consisted chiefly of abuse of women and Scotsmen, whom he declared to be "the two greatest evils upon earth."

== Death ==
The last production by Shebbeare was The Pole Cat, or C. Jennings, the Renegade Schoolmaster ... Detected, 1788, 8vo. Shebbeare died on 1 August 1788, aged 78 or 79, in Eaton Street, Pimlico.

== Family ==
He married young and unhappily. He was quoted by Burney as saying:

I know but too well what it is to be married. I think I have been yoked one and forty years and I have wished my wife underground any time since.

His wife, Susanna, also from Bideford, died on 25 November 1779. They had three children. One, Elizabeth, was baptised 6 April 1737. His son John, baptised 4 September 1734, matriculated at St Mary Hall, Oxford, on 28 October 1758, and graduated B.C.L. in 1765. After having been incumbent of Gaston, Norfolk, John died rector of East Horndon, Essex, on 7 February 1794.

He wrote The Ornaments of Churches considered, with particular view to the late Decoration of St. Margaret's, Westminster.

Some contemporary documents spell his surname "Shebear" or "Shebbear".

== Works ==
Shebbeare's writings generally are vigorous and well informed, and in scurrility go little, if at all, beyond those of the chief polemical writers of the day. Walpole admitted that his pen was "not without force," and Boswell, who was introduced to him by General James Oglethorpe, thought "his knowledge and abilities much above the class of ordinary writers." Besides the works mentioned, he published:

- A Love Epistle in Verse found at Paris, 1753, 4to; reissued in 1755.
- Lydia, or Filial Piety: a novel, 4 vols. 12mo, 1755; 2nd edit. 2 vols. 1769; another edit. 1786.
- Authentic Narrative of the Oppressions of the Islanders of Jersey, to which is prefixed a succinct History of the Military Actions, Constitution, &c., of that Island, 2 vols. 8vo, 1771.
- Address to the Privy Council pointing out an effectual remedy to the Complaints of the Islanders of Jersey, 1772, 8vo.
- Tyranny of the Magistrates of Jersey ... demonstrated from Records of their Courts, 1772, 8vo.
- Answer to the Printed Speech of Edmund Burke, esq. ... in the House of Commons, April 19, 1774, 1775, 8vo.
- Essay on the Origin, Progress, and Establishment of National Society; in which the principles of Government ... contained in Dr. Price's observations are examined and refuted; together with a justification of the Legislature in reducing America to obedience by force; to which is added an appendix on the excellent and admirable in Mr. Burke's speech of 22 March 1775, 1776, 8vo.

Also the following medical works:

- The Practice of Physick, founded on principles in Physiology and Pathology hitherto unapplied in Physical Enquiries (undated)
- Candid Enquiry into the Merits of Dr. Cadogan's Dissertation on the Gout; with appendix containing a certain Cure for Gout, 1772, 8vo.

The full list given in the European Magazine numbers thirty-five pieces. William Wadd (Nugæ Chirurgicæ) wrongly attributes to Shebbeare Charles Johnstone s Chrysal, or the Adventures of a Guinea. The Memoirs of a Lady of Quality, written by the Viscountess Vane and introduced into Peregrine Pickle by Smollett, has also been erroneously assigned to him.
