= Habeas Corpus Bill of 1758 =

The Habeas Corpus Bill of 1758 was a failed bill that would have extended habeas corpus if passed.

The Habeas Corpus Act 1679 confirmed the common law tradition that subjects had a right to a writ of habeas corpus. However, judges ruled that those impressed were exempt from the right to habeas corpus. The Chief Justice Lord Mansfield was in favour of this exemption but the Attorney-General Charles Pratt was not. Pratt, a "uniform Whig", prepared a bill for expanding habeas corpus, the object of which, according to William Holdsworth, "was to extend the Act of 1679 so as to give the benefit of the writ of Habeas Corpus ad subjiciendum, as improved by that Act, to persons who were imprisoned otherwise than on a criminal charge".

It was introduced into the House of Commons (with its first reading on 8 March) where William Pitt the Elder and the Speaker Arthur Onslow supported it and, according to Horace Walpole, "the majority of the house cheerfully promoted it". The Duke of Newcastle tried on 10 March to dissuade Pitt from supporting it, but was met with "a history lesson on the Petition of Right".

It passed easily through the Commons, with its third reading on 24 April, but there was no division at any stage. It reached the House of Lords, where it was read for the first time on 25 April and ordered to be printed, with its second reading on 9 May. Lord Hardwicke asked the judges for their opinions. Lord Temple protested that it was improper to inquire into the opinions of judges because such an opinion would be effected by the bill's proposal to inflict penalties on judges if they refused the writ. Hardwicke said that at a time when civil authority wanted the utmost support it would be wrong to pass the bill. Lord Granville initially spoke for the bill until (according to Walpole) he learned "how unwelcoming it was at St James's". Lord Mansfield and the Duke of Newcastle opposed it. The rest of the judges' views were inconclusive and so on 2 June Mansfield made a 2½ hours' speech against the bill, which Horace Walpole described:

I am not averse to own, that I never heard so much argument, so much sense, so much oratory, united. His deviations into the abstruse minutiae of the law, served but as a foil to the luminous parts of the oration. Perhaps it was the only speech, that, in my time at least, had real effect, that is, convinced many persons. Nor did I ever know how true a votary I was to liberty, till I found that I was not one of the number staggered by that speech.

Hardwicke argued that all judges should have power to issue the writ and, according to Walpole, "said that he would move to order the judges to bring in such a bill against the next session. Lord Temple's friends seemed glad to catch at this proposal; and bill was heard of no more!" When Pitt heard of its rejection in the Lords, he remarked that "it was more honourable to be an Alderman of the City of London than a peer".
