= The Monitor, or the British Freeholder =

18th-century English periodical

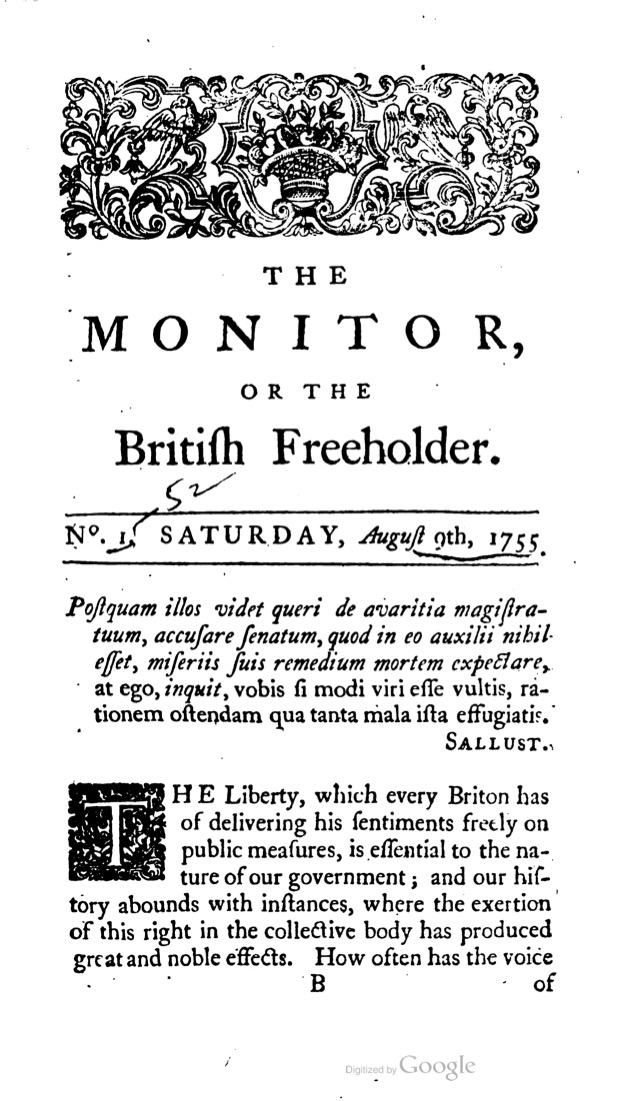
Cover page of The Monitor's first issue, 9 August 1755.

The Monitor, or the British Freeholder was a periodical published in England from 1755 to 1765.

Richard Beckford, a brother of William Beckford, supported the publication financially; Peters argues that he did so in order to shore up support for the Beckfords' political faction. The Beckfords supported Pitt the Elder, and accordingly so did the Monitor. It exclusively published essays and opinion pieces. In this respect, Peters compares it to The North Briton. D. Nichol Smith argues that it was founded "with the purpose of emancipating the King from an arbitrary administration and exposing the arts by which Ministers encroach on the power of the people".

A scathing review of a 1759 issue of the Monitor in The Critical Review noted, evidently alluding to the Monitor's controversialist style:

We should imagine that there is very little occasion for a Monitor, while Mentor stands at the helm of government; while faction and opposition are, in a manner, annihilated; and every individual joyfully acquiesces in the wisdom and uprightness of the administration. … As this volume has already been perused by the public, in single papers, it will be the less necessary for us to give any opinion of them in the aggregate. We cannot say but they are sensible enough; yet there is little or nothing in them new, striking, or animated. They are like middling sermons pronounced by a phlegmatic preacher, plain, heavy, and soporiferous; they co-operate with the narcotic steams of coffee, towards an afternoon's nap: they furnish the city-clubs with political chit-chat, serve to light pipes in the evening, and may be comfortably applied to another domestic purpose in the morning.

Monitor staff included Arthur Beardmore and John Entick. The latter was the plaintiff in Entick v Carrington, a landmark case in the English law of privacy and individual rights. In that case, Entick successfully sued agents of George Montagu-Dunk, 2nd Earl of Halifax, who entered his home to search for allegedly seditious papers published in the Monitor.

== Sources ==
- Peters, Marie (1971). "The 'Monitor' on the Constitution, 1755–1765: New Light on the Ideological Origins of English Radicalism". The English Historical Review. 86 (341): 706–727. doi:10.1093/ehr/LXXXVI.CCCXLI.706. ISSN 0013-8266. JSTOR 563927.
