= Thomas Jones Howell =

Thomas Jones Howell (1793–1858), only son of Thomas Bayly Howell, was born on 24 December 1793. He was admitted to Westminster School on 21 March 1806 and left in 1811. He was admitted of Lincoln's Inn on 9 November 1814 (Register) and called to the bar by the Society of that Inn on 17 May 1822. He was appointed Judge Advocate of the Forces and Judge of the Vice Admiralty Court at Gibraltar in 1822. He was Secretary to the Commissioners of Colonial Inquiry in 1830, and Commissioner for the West India Islands' Relief in 1832 under the West India Loan Act 1832 (2 & 3 Will 4 c 125). In 1833 was appointed Inspector of Factories under the Factory Act 1833 (3 & 4 Will 4 c 103) which office he continued to hold until his death. He was a magistrate and deputy lieutenant for Gloucestershire.

Prinknash Park, home of Sir Thomas Jones Howell

He was of Prinknash Park, Gloucestershire, before he sold Prinknash to James Ackers in 1847. He died at 6 Eaton Place West, London, on 4 June 1858.

He was twice married (in 1817 and 1851). On 4 September 1817 he married Susanna-Maria (died 15 October 1842), eldest daughter of Alexander Macleod of Harris, Inverness. They had three daughters and eight sons, including the reverend William Charles Howell, and Henry Hyett Howell who was director of the Geological Survey of Great Britain. He then married Ellen, daughter of Thomas Fookes. They had one daughter and one son, barrister Alan George Ferrers Howell.

Howell edited the 'State Trials' (vols. xxii. 1815-xxxiii. 1826).
