= John Entick =

English schoolmaster and author

John Entick (c.1703 – May 1773) was an English schoolmaster and author. He was largely a hack writer, working for Edward Dilly, and he padded his credentials with a bogus M.A. and a portrait in clerical dress; some of his works had a more lasting value. In the leading case Entick v Carrington of 1765 he won a legal victory as plaintiff that defined the limits of executive power in the view of the English judiciary.

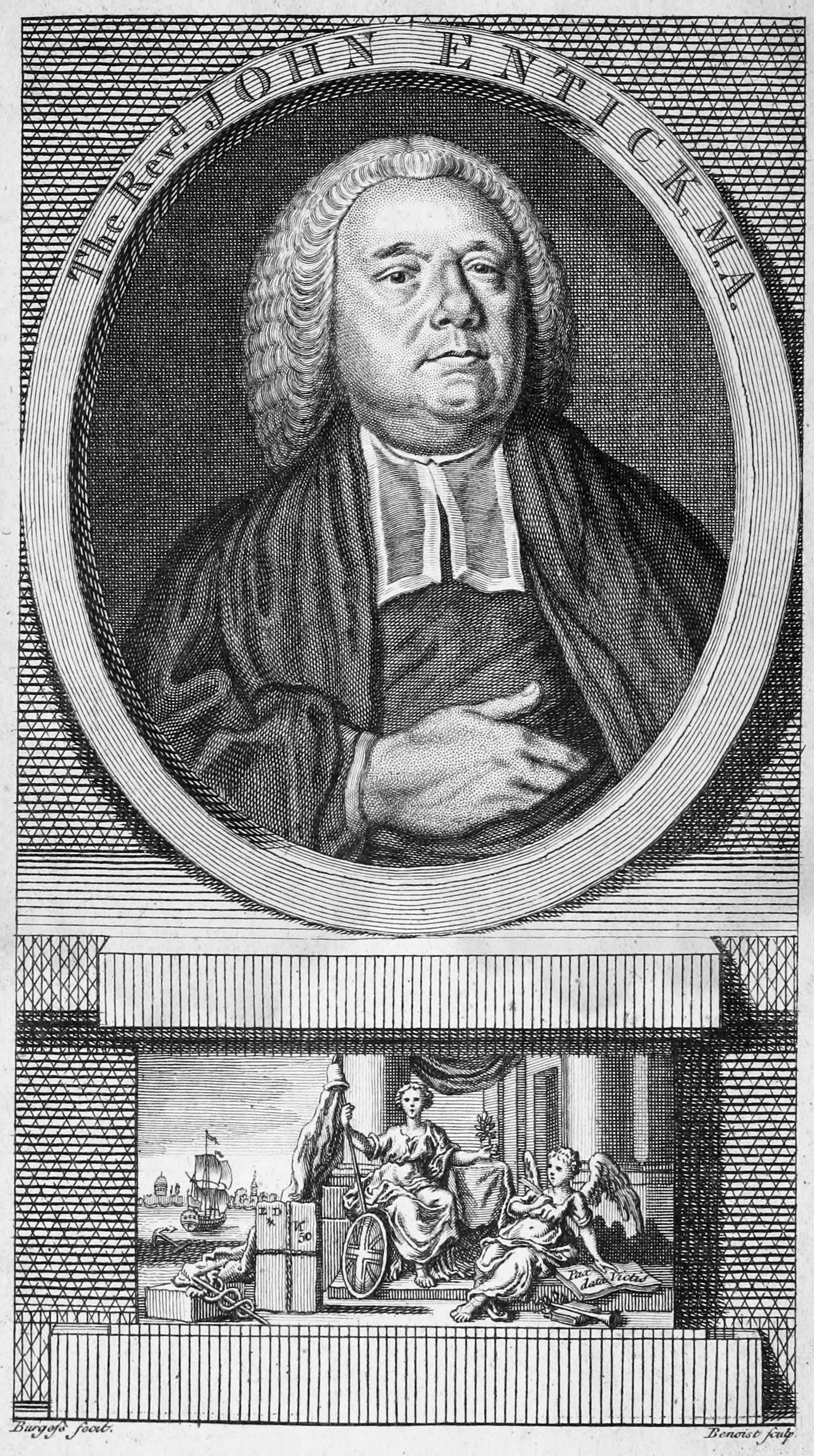
John Entick, 1763 engraving by Guillaume Philippe Benoist

== Life ==
He was probably born about 1703, and resided in the parish of St. Dunstan's, Stepney. In 1755 he agreed with John Shebbeare and Jonathan Scott to write for their anti-ministerial paper, The Monitor, appearing every Saturday, at a salary of £200 a year (according to the Bank of England Inflation Calculator — equivalent to £38,333.92 annually) and his attacks on the government caused his house to be entered and his papers seized under a general warrant in November 1762. He sued the authorities for illegal seizure over this, claiming £2,000 in damages, and obtained a verdict for £300 in 1765.

He died at Stepney, where he was buried, on 22 May 1773, being about seventy years old.

== Works ==
His first publication, the Speculum Latinum (1728), was a simplified scheme to teach Latin. For his Evidences of Christianity (1729) he styled himself on its title-page student of divinity. In 1736 he issued a proposal, which fell through, to print Chaucer in two folio volumes, and he put M.A. after his name. In 1754 he published his Phaedri Fabulae, with accents and notes.

He published in 1757 a New Naval History, with lives and portraits, dedicated to Admiral Edward Vernon. In 1763 he published a General History of the Late War. He issued in 1765 his New Spelling Dictionary; each edition comprised twenty thousand copies; in 1766 he brought out an edition of William Maitland's Survey of London with additions. In 1771 appeared his New Latin and English Dictionary and an English Grammar; and he is credited with a Ready Reckoner, pamphlets on freemasonry, and a share both in the new Week's Preparation and the new Whole Duty of Man. The Lexicon manuale græco-latinvm et latino-græcum. Studio atque opera Josephi Hill, necnon Johannis Entick was a revision of Cornelis Schrevel's Lexicon as edited by Joseph Hill. He left a large work, in four volumes, The Present State of the British Empire, helped by other hands, nearly ready, which was brought out in 1774. In 1776 appeared a new edition of his Survey and History of London. William Crakelt and others edited his dictionaries repeatedly, down to 1836.
