= Arthur Beardmore =

English lawyer

Arthur Beardmore (died 1771) was an English lawyer and a friend of John Wilkes.

Beardmore was an editor of the Monitor. On 6 November 1762 the Secretary of State for the Southern Department, Lord Halifax, issued warrants for the arrest of Beardmore. He was arrested on 11 November for publishing an article on the Princess Dowager and Lord Bute. He made sure he was arrested when he was teaching his son Magna Carta, an act which was commemorated in a popular print in 1764 after he won £1,000 in damages in May of that year.
