= Thomas Salmon (historian) =

British historian and geographer

Thomas Salmon (1679–1767) was an English historical and geographical writer.

== Life ==
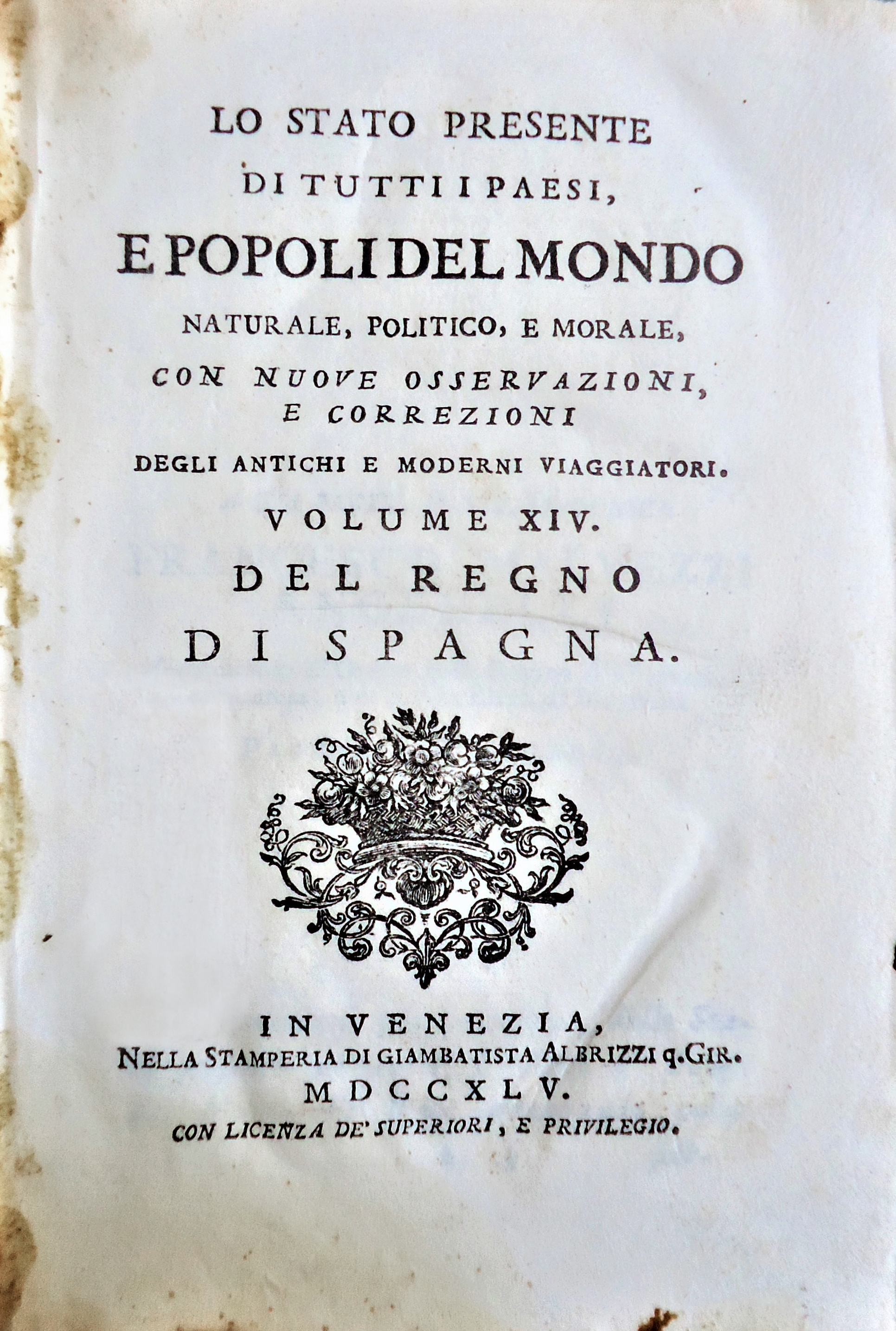
Salmon, Historia moderna, Spagna, vol. XIV, 1745

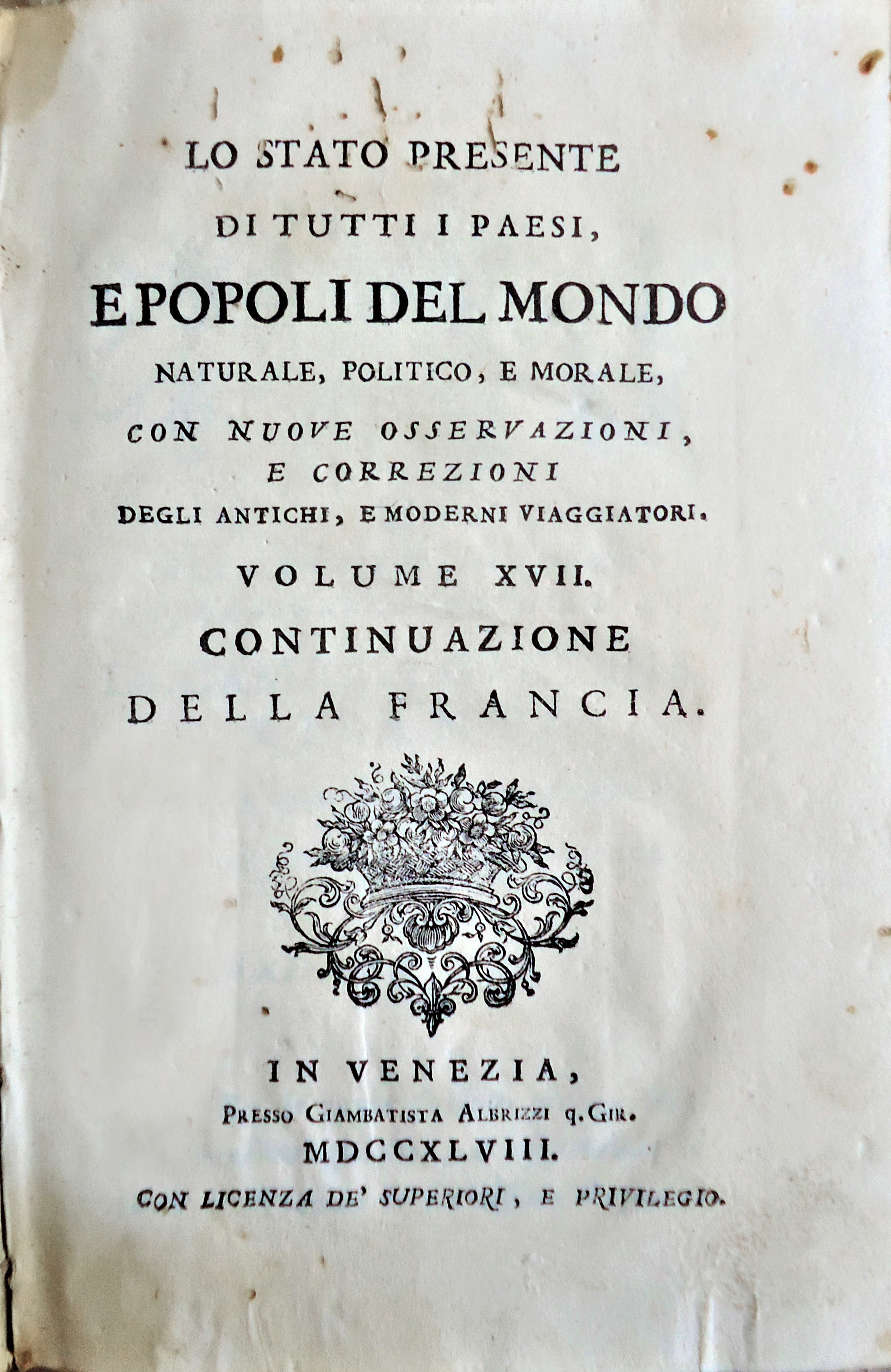
Salmon, Historia moderna, Francia, vol. XVII, 748

Salmon, who was born at Meppershall in Bedfordshire, and baptised there on 2 February 1679, was the son of Thomas Salmon, by his wife Katherine, daughter of John Bradshaw; Nathanael Salmon was his elder brother. William Cole wrote that he wrote much of his work in Cambridge, where he ran a coffee house, and then moved to London. He told Cole that he had spent time at sea, and in both the East and West Indies for some time. He also travelled in Europe.

In 1739–40 Salmon accompanied George Anson on his voyage round the world. He died on 20 January 1767.

== Works ==
Salmon's works were:

- A Review of the History of England, as far as it relates to the Titles and Pretensions of four several Kings, and their Respective Characters, from the Conquest to the Revolution, London, 1722; 2nd ed. 2 vols. London, 1724.
- An Impartial Examination of Bishop Burnet's History of his own Times, 2 vols. London, 1724.
- Bishop Burnet's Proofs of the Pretender's Illegitimacy … compared with the Account given by other writers of the same fact, 2 vols. London, 1724.
- A Critical Essay concerning Marriage … By a Gentleman, London, 1724, and a second edition in the same year under Salmon's name.
- The Characters of the several Noblemen and Gentlemen that have died in the Defence of their Princes, or the Liberties of their Country. Together with the Characters of those who have suffer'd for Treason and Rebellion for the last three hundred years, London, 1724.
- The Chronological Historian, containing a regular Account of all material Transactions and Occurrences, Ecclesiastical, Civil, and Military, relating to the English affairs, from the Invasion of the Romans to the Death of King George I, London, 1733; 3rd ed. continued to the fourteenth year of George II, 2 vols. London, 1747. A French translation, by Garrigue de Froment, appeared in 2 vols., Paris, 1751.
- A new Abridgment and Critical Review of the State Trials and Impeachments for High Treason, London, 1738.
- Modern History, or the Present State of all Nations … illustrated with Cuts and Maps … by Herman Moll, 3 vols. London, 1739; 3rd ed. 3 vols. London, 1744–6. This is his major work, and it was abridged, continued, and published under various fictitious names. A Dutch translation, in forty-four parts, appeared at Amsterdam, 1729–1820, and an Italian translation in twenty-three volumes, at Venice, 1740–61.
- The Present State of the Universities, and of the five adjacent Counties of Cambridge, Huntingdon, Bedford, Buckingham, and Oxford, London, 1744. Only one volume appeared, containing the history of the county, city, and university of Oxford.
- General Description of England, and particularly of London, the Metropolis, mentioned in the preface of the previous work, 2 vols.
- The Modern Gazetteer, or a short View of the several Nations of the World, London, 1746; 3rd ed. London, 1756; 6th ed. with additions and new maps, London, 1759.
- The Foreigner's Companion through the Universities of Oxford and Cambridge and the adjacent Counties, describing the several Colleges and other Public Buildings, London, 1748.
- Considerations on the Bill for a General Naturalisation, London, 1748.
- A New Geographical and Historical Grammar, with a set of twenty-two Maps, London, 1749; 2nd ed. 1751; 6th ed. 1758; other editions updated by J. Tytler, Edinburgh, 1778 and 1782; 13th ed. London, 1785.
- A Short View of the Families of the present English Nobility, London, 1751; 2nd ed. 1758; 3rd ed. 1761.
- The Universal Traveller, or a Compleat Description of the several Nations of the World, 2 vols. London, 1752–3.
- A Short View of the Families of the present Irish Nobility, London, 1759.
- A Short View of the Families of the Scottish Nobility, London, 1759.

Salmon also, in 1725, brought out an edition of his father's Historical Collections of Great Britain. To it he prefixed a preface commenting on the partisan approaches of Paul de Rapin de Thoyras and other historians.

=== Editor of State Trials ===
Salmon is now credited as the initial editor of the State Trials, the collection of reports on significant trials, mostly on treason charges, that had editions well into the 19th century. Sollom Emlyn continued his five volumes, which were reprinted whole in 1730, with two more in 1735. Francis Hargrave, in a preface to the 4th edition, was explicit about Salmon's involvement in the 1738 Critical Review of the Trials. He deduced that Salmon was editor of the first edition, in 1719. He commented also on the effect of Salmon's Tory politics on the work; and (positively) on the sourcing he provided for some of the material. This identification of Salmon as original editor is now accepted. He was working for the printer John Darby the younger (died 1733) from about 1716, on materials Darby provided. His initial shaping of the collection persisted across numerous later editions.

- A Complete Collection of State Trials, vol I: 1388–1648 (1730)
- A Complete Collection of State Trials, vol V: 1696–1709 (1730)
- A Complete Collection of State Trials, vol VII (supplement): 1549–1688 (1735)

== Notes ==
Attribution

This article incorporates text from a publication now in the public domain: Lee, Sidney, ed. (1897). "Salmon, Thomas (1679-1767)". Dictionary of National Biography. Vol. 50. London: Smith, Elder & Co.
