= Sollom Emlyn =

Irish legal writer (1697–1754)

Sollom Emlyn (27 December 1697 – 28 June 1754) was an Irish legal writer.

== Life ==
Emlyn was the second son of Thomas Emlyn. He was born at Dublin, where his father was at the time settled, on 27 December 1697. He studied law, entered as a student at Leiden University 17 Sept. 1714, became a member of Lincoln's Inn, and rose to be of great reputation as a chamber counsel. Emlyn was anxious for reforms of the law, and very forcibly pointed out the defects in the system as then practised. He remarked in 1730 on the 'tediousness and delays' of civil suits, 'the exorbitant fees to counsel, whereto the costs recovered bear no proportion,’ the overgreat 'nicety of special pleadings,’ the scandal of the ecclesiastical courts. In criminal law he objected to the forced unanimity of the jury, the Latin record of the proceedings, the refusal of counsel to those charged with felony, the practice of pressing to death obstinately mute prisoners, capital punishment for trifling offences, 'the oppressions and extortions of gaolers,’ and generally the bad management of gaols.

He continued the edition of Thomas Salmon's A Complete Collection of State Trials, which was subsequently expanded by Francis Hargrave and then Thomas Bayly Howell.

Emlyn died 28 June 1754. He was interred in Bunhill Fields burying-ground, where there is an inscription to his memory. He married on 10 November 1729 Mary, daughter of Rev. William Woodhouse, by whom he had two sons: Thomas, a chancery barrister, who died in 1796; and Sollom (d. 1744).

== Works ==
- (ed.) Sir Matthew Hale's History of the Pleas of the Crown, 1736.
- Queries relating to Elizabeth Canning's Case, with Answers, 1754.
- (ed.) State Trials, 2nd ed., printed with a preface in six volumes folio in 1730
  - A Complete Collection of State Trials, vol VII (supplement): 1549–1688 (1735)
- (ed.) Works of Thomas Evelyn, with a prefatory biography (4th ed. 3 vols. 1746).
