= Florence Hensey =

18th-century Irish physician and spy

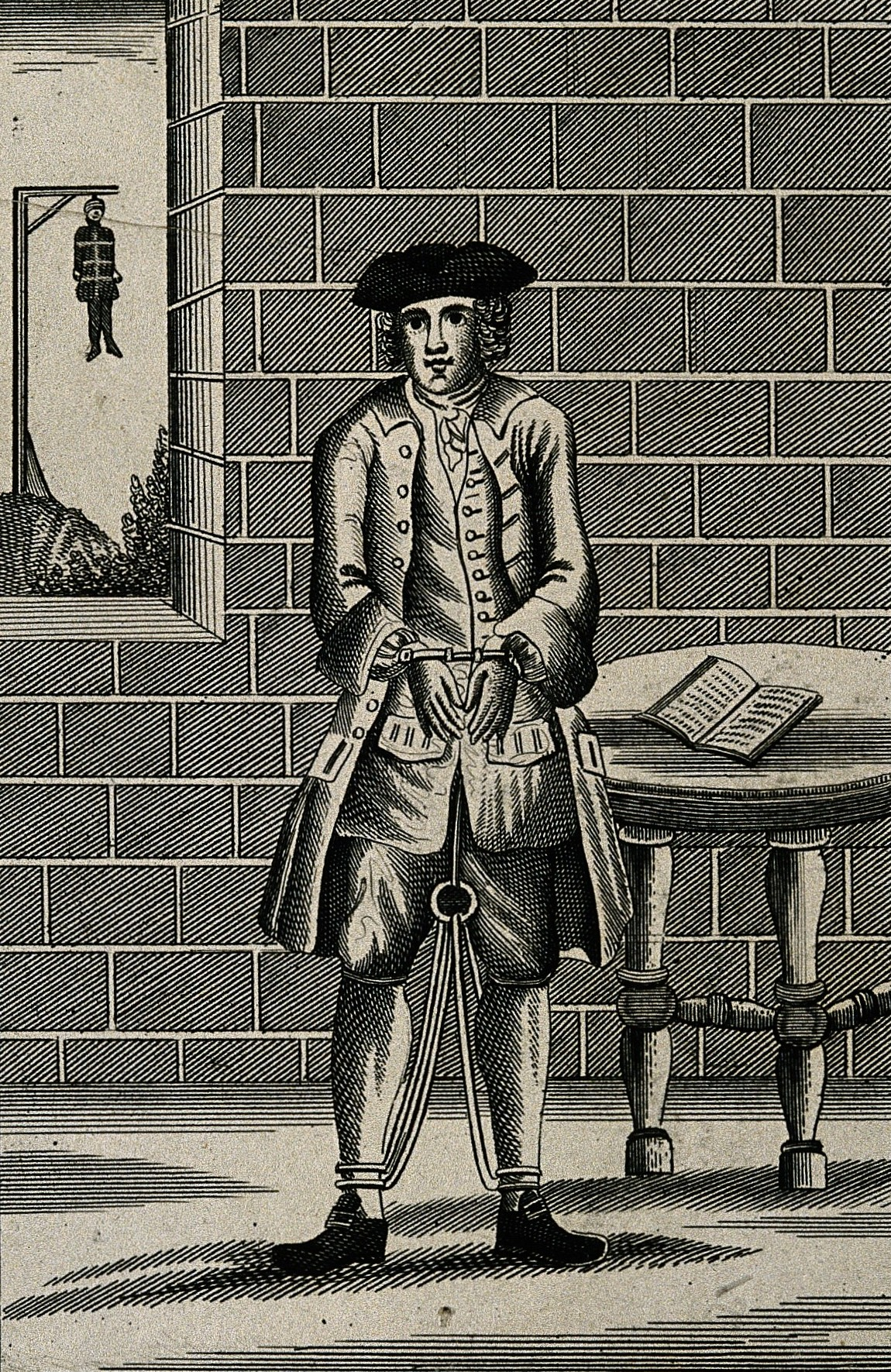
Engraving of Hensey after his arrest

Florence Hensey (also Henchy, Henzy; fl. 1748–1759) was an Irish physician, and a spy for France during the Seven Years' War.

== Life ==
Hensey was born in Kildare about 1714, a son of Florence Henchey of Ballycumeen, County Clare, and his wife Mary; the couple had two other sons and a daughter. When very young he came to England, and in October 1748 entered as a student of medicine in Leyden, where he graduated M.D. He afterwards travelled in, and studied the languages of, Switzerland, Italy, Portugal, and Spain. He then settled in Paris, where for some years he practised as a physician, and learnt French. Finally he moved to England, and commenced practice in London.

On the outbreak of the Seven Years' War in 1756, Hensey opened a correspondence with a former fellow-student who was then engaged in the French foreign office. As a result he entered the French service as a spy, and in return for a salary of a hundred guineas a year supplied information as to the movements and equipment of the English fleet. He warned the French of the intended Raid on Rochefort in 1757, and his warning seems to have contributed to the failure of that enterprise. Hensey wrote his reports in lemon juice between the lines of innocuous-looking letters sent to France through intermediaries, including his brother Joseph who was chaplain to the Spanish ambassador at the Hague. A postman, who had observed his frequent foreign correspondence, called the attention of his superiors to the matter, and evidence was obtained which led to his arrest, on 21 August 1757, as he came from the chapel of the Spanish ambassador in Soho Square.

After many examinations before the secretary of state, Hensey was committed to Newgate Prison on 9 March 1758, and on 8 May was brought before the King's Bench and ordered to prepare for his trial. The trial took place before Earl Mansfield on 12 June, occupying all day. The evidence of guilt was overpowering; further letters were found at Hensey's lodgings in Arundel Street, Strand, in a bureau of which he alone had the key, and were conclusively shown to be in his handwriting. There was practically no defence, and such technical objections as were raised were overruled. On 14 June Hensey was condemned to death as a traitor; but on 12 July, the day appointed for his execution, he received a respite for a fortnight, and this period was afterwards extended, until on 7 September 1759 he was released on bail in order to plead his pardon next term. The reprieves may have been due to co-operation with the authorities in providing further information, or because of official Spanish intervention. After this Hensey disappeared, his destination perhaps being France or Ireland.
