= Thomas Bayly Howell =

English lawyer and writer (1767–1815)

- Born: 6 September 1767; Jamaica
- Died: 13 April 1815 (aged 47)
- Education: Christ Church, Oxford
- Occupation: Lawyer
- Known for: Howell's State Trials

Thomas Bayly Howell FRS (6 September 1767 – 13 April 1815) was an English lawyer and writer who edited and lent his name to Howell's State Trials.

== Life ==
Thomas Bayly Howell was born in Jamaica. His family returned to England in 1770 to settle at Prinknash Park near Gloucester. Howell studied at Christ Church, Oxford but did not graduate, instead moving on to Lincoln's Inn and being called to the bar in 1790.

In 1808, William Cobbett asked Howell to edit a new edition of the State Trials, a work aspiring to aggregate all the important cases on public law in England. Former compilations of the subject were published by Thomas Salmon, Sollom Emlyn and Francis Hargrave over the previous century. Howell worked on the project from 1809 to 1814, his son, Thomas Jones Howell taking over from him. A modern edition of the State Trials was edited by Donald Thomas and published in two volumes in 1972.

== Honours ==
- Fellow of the Royal Society, (1804)
- Fellow of the Society of Antiquaries

== Bibliography ==
- Baildon, W. P. (ed.) (1896) The Records of the Honorable Society of Lincoln's Inn: Admissions, 1, 502
- Baildon, W. P. (ed.) (1902) The Records of the Honorable Society of Lincoln's Inn: The Black Books, 4, 240, 249
- Burke, J. (1833–38) A Genealogical and Heraldic History of the Commoners of Great Britain and Ireland, 4 vols
- Goodwin, Gordon; Harris, Jonathan (revised) (2004). "Howell, Thomas Bayly (1767–1815)". Oxford Dictionary of National Biography (online ed.). Oxford University Press. doi:10.1093/ref:odnb/13980. (Subscription, Wikipedia Library access or UK public library membership required.)
- Howell, T. B. (1972). Thomas, D. S. (ed.). State Trials. London: Routledge & Kegan Paul. ISBN 0-7100-7325-9., 2 vols
- Wallace, J. W. (1882) The Reporters, 4th ed., 64–9
- General Index to the Collection of State Trials compiled by Howell and Howell (1828), by David Jardine
- Howell's Complete Collection of State Trials, from the Earliest Period to the Year 1783:
  - 1809 edition, vol I: 1163–1600 (1816 edition, vol I: 1163–1600)
  - 1809 edition, vol II: 1603–1627
  - 1809 edition, vol III: 1627–1640 (1816 edition, vol III: 1627–1640)
  - 1809 edition, vol IV: 1640–1649 (1816 edition, vol IV: 1640–1649)
  - 1810 edition, vol V: 1650–1661 (1816 edition, vol V: 1650–1661)
  - 1810 edition, vol VI: 1661–1678 (1816 edition, vol VI: 1661–1678)
  - 1810 edition, vol VII: 1678–1680 (1816 edition, vol VII: 1678–1680)
  - 1810 edition, vol VIII: 1680–1682 (1816 edition, vol VIII: 1680–1682)
  - 1811 edition, vol IX: 1682–1684 (1816 edition, vol IX: 1682–1684)
  - 1811 edition, vol X: 1680–1685 (1816 edition, vol X: 1684–1685)
  - 1811 edition, vol XI: 1680–1688 (1816 edition, vol XI: 1680–1688)
  - 1812 edition, vol XII: 1687–1696 (1816 edition, vol XII: 1687–1696)
  - 1812 edition, vol XIII: 1696–1697 (1816 edition, vol XIII: 1696–1700)
  - 1812 edition, vol XIV: 1700–1708
  - 1812 edition, vol XV: 1710–1719 (1816 edition, vol XV: 1710-1719)
  - 1812 edition, vol XVI: 1722–1725
  - 1816 edition, vol XVII: 1726–1743
  - 1813 edition, vol XVIII: 1743–1753 (1816 edition, vol XVIII: 1744–1753)
  - 1816 edition, vol XIX: 1753–1770
  - 1816 edition, vol XX: 1772–1777
  - 1814 edition, vol XXI: 1778–1784 (1816 edition, vol XXI: 1778–1779)
- Continued from the Year 1783 to the Present Time:
  - 1817 edition, vol XXII: 1783–1794
  - 1817 edition, vol XXIII: 1793–1794
  - 1818 edition, vol XXIV: 1794
  - 1818 edition, vol XXV: 1794–1796
  - 1819 edition, vol XXVI: 1796–1798
  - 1820 edition, vol XXVII: 1798–1800
  - 1820 edition, vol XXVIII: 1802–1803
  - 1821 edition, vol XXIX: 1804–1806
  - 1823 edition, vol XXXI: 1809–1813
  - 1826 edition, vol XXXIII: 1817–1820
