= List of college literary societies =

The following is a list of college literary societies by country.

== Canadian college literary societies ==
Active societies are indicated in bold. Inactive societies and institutions are in italics.

Society	Founding date and range	Institution	Location	Status	References
Levana Debating Society		Queen's University at Kingston	Kingston, Ontario, Canada	Inactive	(Note: This female group was absorbed by the Queens Debating Union when it became co-ed.)
Queen's Alma Mater Society	1858	Queen's University at Kingston	Kingston, Ontario, Canada		
**Queen's Debating Union**	1843	Queen's University at Kingston	Kingston, Ontario, Canada	Active	(Note: Originally called the Dialectic Society of Queen's College.)
**University College Literary and Athletic Society**	February 22, 1854	University College, Toronto	Toronto, Ontario, Canada	Active	

== Indian college literary societies ==
Active societies are indicated in bold. Inactive societies and institutions are in italics.

Society	Founding date and range	Institution	Location	Status	References
Eulexian Society	1860	St. Stephen's College, Delhi	University Enclave, New Delhi, India	Inactive	
**English Literary Society**		Shri Ram College of Commerce	Delhi, India	Active	
**English Literary Society**		Guru Nanak Khalsa College for Women	Ludhiana, India	Active	
**English Literary Society**		St. Joseph's College, Bangalore	Bangalore, India	Active	
**The English Literary Society**		St. Stephen's College, Delhi	University Enclave, New Delhi, India	Active	

== Irish college literary societies ==
Active societies are indicated in bold. Inactive societies and institutions are in italics.

Society	Founding date and range	Institution	Location	Status	References
**Literary & Debating Society**	1846	University of Galway	Galway, Ireland	Active	(Note: Formed as the Literary and Scientific Society.)
**English & Literary Society (LitSoc)**		University College Dublin	Dublin, Ireland	Active	
**Literary and Historical Society**	1855	University College Dublin	Dublin, Ireland	Active	
**Literary and Debating Society**	1795	Maynooth University	Maynooth, Ireland	Inactive	

== United Kingdom college literary societies ==
Active societies are indicated in bold. Inactive societies and institutions are in italics.

Society	Founding date and range	Institution	Location	Status	References
**The English Society**		St. John's College, Cambridge	Cambridge, England	Active	
**The English Society**		University of Manchester	Manchester, England	Active	
**Shirley Society**	1919	St Catharine's College, Cambridge	Cambridge, England	Active	

== United States men's literary societies ==
Active societies are indicated in bold. Inactive societies and institutions are in italics.

Society	Founding date and range	Institution	Location	Status	References
Addisonian Society	1851	Kentucky Military Institute	Lyndon, Kentucky	Inactive	
Addisonian Society	1861	Wayland Baptist University	Plainview, Texas	Inactive	
Adelphean Society	1851	Wesleyan University	Middletown, Connecticut	Inactive	
Adelphene Society	1868	Union Christian College, Merom	Merom, Indiana	Inactive	
Adelphian Society	1860	Furman University	Greenville, South Carolina	Inactive	
Adelphic Society	1860	Northwestern University	Evanston, Illinois	Inactive	
Adelphi Society	1845	Knox College	Galesburg, Illinois	Inactive	
Adelphi Society	1842	Howard College	Birmingham, Alabama	Inactive	
Adelphian Society	July 24, 1840 – December 10, 1880	Colgate University	Hamilton, New York	Inactive	(Note: The society became a chapter of Theta Pi Fraternity.)
Adelphian Society	1858	Cornell College	Mount Vernon, Iowa	Inactive	
Adelphic Society	1796	Union College	Schenectady, New York	Inactive	
Adelphic Society	1831–1840	Western Reserve University	Hudson, Ohio	Inactive	
Adelphic Society	1872	Geneva College	Beaver Falls, Pennsylvania	Inactive	
Adelphic Union Literary Society	1870	Maryville College	Maryville, Tennessee	Inactive	
Aeonian Society	July 24, 1840 – 1887	Colgate University	Hamilton, New York	Inactive	
Agatheridan Society	1825	University of Nashville	Nashville, Tennessee	Inactive	
Alka Society	1866	Willamette University	Salem, Oregon	Inactive	
Alamo Society	1873	Southwestern University	Georgetown, Texas	Inactive	
Alethezethian Society	1854	Antioch College	Yellow Springs, Ohio	Inactive	
Alethean Society	1855	Baldwin University	Berea, Ohio	Inactive	
Alethean Society	1859	Beloit College	Beloit, Wisconsin	Inactive	
Alethean Society	1881	Southwestern University	Georgetown, Texas	Inactive	
Alethearian Society	1849	Geneva College	Beaver Falls, Pennsylvania	Inactive	
Alexandrian Society	1821	Amherst College	Amherst, Massachusetts	Inactive	
Alfreidian Lyceum Society	1846	Alfred University	Alfred, New York	Inactive	
Alleghenian Lyceum Society	1851	Alfred University	Alfred, New York	Inactive	
Allegheny Society	1835	Allegheny College	Meadville, Pennsylvania	Inactive	
Alpha Delta Society	1868	Hiram College	Hiram, Ohio	Inactive	
Alpha Kappa Phi Society	1857	Hillsdale College	Hillsdale, Michigan	Inactive	
Alpha Kappa Society	1839	Marietta College	Marietta, Ohio	Inactive	
Alpha Nu Society	1843	University of Michigan	Ann Arbor, Michigan	Inactive	
**Alpha Omega Delta Literary Society**	1947	Bob Jones University	Greenville, South Carolina	Active	
Alpha Sigma	1882	Maryville College	Maryville, Tennessee	Inactive	
American Whig Society	1765–1928	Princeton University	Princeton, New Jersey	Inactive	
**American Whig-Cliosophic Society**	1928	Princeton University	Princeton, New Jersey	Active	
Amphictyon Society	1853	Cornell College	Mount Vernon, Iowa	Inactive	
Amphictyon Society	1851	Lawrence University	Appleton, Wisconsin	Inactive	
Amphictyon Society	1857	Hillsdale College	Hillsdale, Michigan	Inactive	
Animi Cultus	1867–1882	Maryville College	Maryville, Tennessee	Inactive	(Note: Became Alpha Sigma, also a literary society, in 1882.)
Archaean Society	1859	Beloit College	Beloit, Wisconsin	Inactive	
**Archanian Society**	March 27, 1954	University of the Pacific	Stockton, California	Active	
Aristotelian Society	1854	Central Methodist University	Fayette, Missouri	Inactive	
Aristotelian Society	December 6, 1867	Harlem Springs College	Harlem Springs, Ohio	Inactive	
Aristonian Society	1870	Wheaton College	Wheaton, Illinois	Inactive	
**Ars Sapientiae**	2024	Lehigh University	Bethlehem, Pennsylvania	Active	
Atheneum Society	1870	Willamette University	Salem, Oregon	Inactive	
Arkansas Literary and Debating Society	1879	Lyon College	Batesville, Arkansas	Inactive	
Athena	1916–1933	University of Iowa	Iowa City, Iowa	Inactive	
Athena Society	1858	Lawrence University	Appleton, Wisconsin	Inactive	
Athenaean Society	1802–1887	Bowdoin College	Brunswick, Maine	Inactive	
Athenaeum Society	1824	Trinity College	Hartford, Connecticut	Inactive	
Athenaeum Society	1860	University of Chicago	Chicago, Illinois	Inactive	
Athenaean Society	1869	King College	Bristol, Tennessee	Inactive	
Atheniaedes Society	1845	Albion College	Albion, Michigan	Inactive	
Athenian Literary Society	1900	Ouachita Baptist University	Arkadelphia, Arkansas	Inactive	
Athenian Society	1776–1786	Rutgers University	New Brunswick, New Jersey	Inactive	
Athenian Society	1821	Amherst College	Amherst, Massachusetts	Inactive	
Athenian Society	1830	Indiana University Bloomington	Bloomington, Indiana	Inactive	
Athenian Society	1850	University of Wisconsin	Madison, Wisconsin	Inactive	
Athenian Society	1851	Ohio Wesleyan University	Delaware, Ohio	Inactive	
Athenian Society	1867	Tennessee Wesleyan College	Athens, Tennessee	Inactive	
Bachelor Society	1870	Iowa State University	Ames, Iowa	Inactive	
Baconian Society	1870–1906	State University of New York at Potsdam	Potsdam, New York	Inactive	
Bainonian	1875	Maryville College	Maryville, Tennessee	Inactive	
Basilian Society	1869	Niagara University	Lewiston, New York	Inactive	
**Belles Lettres Society**	1786	Dartmouth College	Hanover, New Hampshire	Active	
**Belles Lettres Society**	1786	Dickinson College	Carlisle, Pennsylvania	Active	
Belles Letters Society	1859	Illinois Wesleyan University	Bloomington, Illinois	Inactive	
Belles Letters Society	1850	Lycoming College	Williamsport, Pennsylvania	Inactive	
Belles Letters Society	1851	MacMurray College	Jacksonville, Illinois	Inactive	
Belles Lettres Society	1859	Southern University	Greensboro, Alabama	Inactive	
Beltionian Society	1856	Wheaton College	Wheaton, Illinois	Inactive	
**Benjamin Franklin Literary and Debating Society**	2015	University of Virginia	Charlottesville, Virginia	Active	
Berean Society	1861	University of Chicago	Chicago, Illinois	Inactive	
Beth-Hacma	1829–1860s	Maryville College	Maryville, Tennessee	Inactive	(Note: This society ceased operations due to the Civil War and was not re-established.)
Beth-Hacma ve Berith	1834	Maryville College	Maryville, Tennessee	Inactive	
Bettina Society	1871	German Wallace College	Berea, Ohio	Inactive	
Bonhommian Society	1871	Highland University	Highland, Kansas	Inactive	
**Brothers in Unity**	1768–1878, 2022	Yale University	New Haven, Connecticut	Active	
Brown Debating Club	September 1866	Stockwell Collegiate Institute	Stockwell, Indiana	Inactive	
**Burke Society**	2010	University of Virginia	Charlottesville, Virginia	Active	
Byronic Literary Society	December 6, 1867	Harlem Springs College	Harlem Springs, Ohio	Inactive	
Calhoun Society	1854	Wofford College	Spartanburg, South Carolina	Inactive	
Calliope Academy	1855	Spring Hill College	Mobile, Alabama	Inactive	
Calliopean Society	1793–1890	Union College	Schenectady, New York	Inactive	
**Calliopean Society**	1819–1853, 1950	Yale University	New Haven, Connecticut	Active	(Note: Also called Phi Epsilon Mu.)
Calliopean Society	1830	Maine Wesleyan Seminary	Kents Hill, Maine	Inactive	
Calliopean Society	1835	Granville Literary and Theological Institution	Granville, Ohio.	Inactive	
**Calliopean Society**	1840	Emory & Henry University	Emory, Virginia	Active	
Calliopean Society	1845	The Citadel	Charleston, South Carolina	Inactive	
Calliopean Society	1847	Wabash College	Crawfordsville, Indiana	Inactive	
Calliopean Society	1879	Texas A&M University	College Station, Texas	Inactive	(Note: Formed by students who split off from the Stephen F. Austin Literary Society.)
Castelian Society	1870	Rockford College	Rockford, Illinois	Inactive	
**Chi Beta Society**	1920	Illinois College	Jacksonville, Illinois	Active	
Chi Delta Society	1836	East Tennessee University	Knoxville, Tennessee	Inactive	
Chi Delta Theta	1821	Yale University	New Haven, Connecticut	Inactive	
Chrestomathean Society	1847	Ohio Wesleyan University	Delaware, Ohio	Inactive	
Chrestomathean	1889–c. 1917	Hanover College	Hanover, Indiana	Inactive	(Note: The society discontinued its meetings during World War I so that its members could volunteer for the Red Cross. However, it did not reform after the war.)
Chrestomathian Society	1853	Grinnell College	Grinnell, Iowa	Inactive	
Chrestomathic Society	1848–1948	College of Charleston	Charleston, South Carolina	Inactive	
Ciceronian Society	1823	George Washington University	Washington, D.C.	Inactive	
Ciceronian Society	1834	Mercer University	Macon, Georgia	Inactive	(Note: Formed when the Franklin Literary Society dissolved.)
Ciceronian Society	1839–c. 1932	Georgetown College	Georgetown, Kentucky	Inactive	
Ciceronian Society	1850	Roanoke College	Salem, Virginia	Inactive	
Clariosophic Literary Society	1873	University of Arkansas	Fayetteville, Arkansas	Inactive	
**Clariosophic Society**	1806–xxxx ?; 2013	University of South Carolina	Columbia, South Carolina	Active	
**Cleo of Alpha Chi**	1877	Trinity College	Hartford, Connecticut	Active	
Clever Fellows Society	1844	Albion College	Albion, Michigan	Inactive	
Clio Society	1853	Capital University	Bexley, Ohio	Inactive	
Clio Society	1885	Southwestern University	Georgetown, Texas	Inactive	
**Clionian Literary Society**	1869	McKendree College	Lebanon, Illinois	Active	
Clionian Society	1851	Free Academy of the City of New York	New York City, New York	Inactive	
Clionian Society	1866	Almira College	Greenville, Illinois	Inactive	
Cliolian Society	1871	Iowa State University	Ames, Iowa	Inactive	
Cliosophic Society	1765–1928	Princeton University	Princeton, New Jersey	Inactive	
Cliosophic Society	1838	Georgetown College	Georgetown, Kentucky	Inactive	
Clariosophic Society	1859	Southern University	Greensboro, Alabama	Inactive	
Columbian Debating Society	1845 – October 10, 1846	Richmond College	Richmond, Virginia	Inactive	(Note: In the fall semester of 1846, the Columbian Debating Society and the Washington Debating Society formed a temporary alliance as Mu Sigma Rho. The merger as Mu Sigma Rho Literary Society became official in February 1847.)
Crescent Society	1855	Antioch College	Yellow Springs, Ohio	Inactive	
Crescent Society	1870	Iowa State University	Ames, Iowa	Inactive	
Crotonia	1750–1772, 2007	Yale University	New Haven, Connecticut	Active	
Daedalian Literary Society	1923	Indiana State Normal School	Terre Haute, Indiana	Inactive	(Note: The Daedalian Literary Society at Indiana State became Delta Lambda Sigma in 1923; Delta Lambda Sigma affiliated with Lambda Chi Alpha in 1952.)
De La Salle Club	1865	Manhattan College	New York City, New York	Inactive	
Delean Society	1859	Beloit College	Beloit, Wisconsin	Inactive	
Delphic Society	1854–1875	Hiram College	Hiram, Ohio	Inactive	
Delphic Society	1871–1889	State University of New York at Geneseo	Geneseo, New York	Inactive	
Delta Rho Society	1926–1928	Lyon College	Batesville, Arkansas	Inactive	
Delta Sigma Society	1892	Lyon College	Batesville, Arkansas	Inactive	
**Demosthenian Literary Society**	1803	University of Georgia	Athens, Georgia	Active	
Demosthenean Literary Society	1907	University of Arkansas	Fayetteville, Arkansas	Inactive	
Diagnothian Society	1835	Franklin & Marshall College	Lancaster, Pennsylvania	Inactive	
**Dialectic Society**	1795	University of North Carolina at Chapel Hill	Chapel Hill, North Carolina	Active	
Dialectic Society	1839	Oberlin College	Oberlin, Ohio	Inactive	
Eclectic Society	1845	Albion College	Albion, Michigan	Inactive	
**Elizabethan Club**	1911	Yale University	New Haven, Connecticut	Active	
Emma Willards Society	1853	Waynesburg College	Waynesburg, Pennsylvania	Inactive	
**Enosinian Society**	1822	George Washington University	Washington, D.C.	Active	
Erodelphian	1843–1845	Hanover College	Hanover, Indiana	Inactive	
Erodelphian Society	1862–1933	University of Iowa	Iowa City, Iowa	Inactive	
Erodelphian Literary Society	1825–1924	Miami University	Oxford, Ohio	Inactive	
Erodelphian Society	1854	Burlington College	Burlington, Vermont	Inactive	
Erodelphian Society	1870	Highland University	Highland, Kansas	Inactive	
Erosophian Adelphoi Society	1835	Colby College	Waterville, Maine	Inactive	
Erosophic Society	1831–1933	University of Alabama	Tuscaloosa, Alabama	Inactive	
Erosophic Society	1847	Mercer University	Macon, Georgia	Inactive	
Erosophic Society	1891	Lyon College	Batesville, Arkansas	Inactive	
Erosophian Society	1855	Marshall University	Huntington, West Virginia	Inactive	
Erosophian Society	1860	Lombard College	Galesburg, Illinois	Inactive	
Erosophian Society	1865	Baylor College	Waco, Texas	Inactive	
Eucleian Society	1834–1943	New York University	New York City, New York	Inactive	
**Euglossian Society**	1913	Heidelberg University	Tiffin, Ohio	Active	
Erosophian Society	1867	Albion College	Albion, Michigan	Inactive	
Eulexian Literary Society	November 27, 1867 – January 1870; March 1871	St. Augustine College	Benicia, California	Inactive	(Note: Chapter closed briefly when all of its original members left college.)
Eulexian Society	1860	St. Stephens College	Annandale-on-Hudson, New York	Inactive	
Eutaxian Society	1876	University of Oregon	Eugene, Oregon	Inactive	
**Eumenean Society**	1837	McKendree College	Lebanon, Illinois	Active	
**Eumenean Society**	April 14, 1837	Davidson College	Davidson, North Carolina	Active	
Eumenean Society	1898–1918	Birmingham–Southern College	Birmingham, Alabama	Inactive	(Note: Absorbed by the Clariosophic Society when Southern University and Birmingham College merged to form Birmingham-Southern College in 1918.)
**Euphemian Literary Society**	1839	Erskine College	Due West, South Carolina	Active	
**Euphradian Society**	1806	University of South Carolina	Columbia, South Carolina	Active	
Euphradian Society	1831	College of Charleston	Charleston, South Carolina	Inactive	
Euphronean Society	1835	Wabash College	Crawfordsville, Indiana	Inactive	
Eupia Society	1850	Bucknell University	Lewisburg, Pennsylvania	Inactive	
Eurodelphian Society	1857	Spring Hill College	Mobile, Alabama	Inactive	
Euterpean Society	1867	Muhlenberg College	Allentown, Pennsylvania	Inactive	
**Euzelian Society**	1835	Wake Forest University	Wake Forest, North Carolina	Active	
**Excelsior Men's Society**	1851	Heidelberg University	Tiffin, Ohio	Active	
Excelsior Society	1858	Albright College	Reading, Pennsylvania	Inactive	
Excelsior Society	1872	Wheaton College	Wheaton, Illinois	Inactive	
F. H. C.	1750–1787	College of William & Mary	Williamsburg, Virginia	Inactive	
Few Society	August 10, 1839 – 1932	Emory University	Atlanta, Georgia	Inactive	(Note: Formed from a division of Phi Gamma Society)
**Franklin Literary Society**	1797	Jefferson College	Canonsburg, Pennsylvania	Active	
Franklin Literary Society	1898	Hendrix College	Conway, Arkansas	Inactive	
Franklin Literary Society	1908	University of Arkansas	Fayetteville, Arkansas	Inactive	
Franklin Polemic Society	1833–1834	Mercer University	Macon, Georgia	Inactive	
Franklin Reading Society	1860	Furman University	Greenville, South Carolina	Inactive	
Franklin Society	1824–1834	Brown University	Providence, Rhode Island	Inactive	
Franklin Society	1826	College of William & Mary	Williamsburg, Virginia	Inactive	
Franklin Society	1831–1840	Western Reserve University	Hudson, Ohio	Inactive	
Franklin Society	1842	Howard College	Birmingham, Alabama	Inactive	
Franklin Society	1843	Granville Literary and Theological Institution	Granville, Ohio	Inactive	
Franklin Society	March 1843	Richmond College	Richmond, Virginia	Inactive	
**Gamma Delta Society**	1911	Illinois College	Jacksonville, Illinois	Active	
Gamma Epsilon Society	1852	Lycoming College	Williamsport, Pennsylvania	Inactive	
**Gamma Nu Society**	1897	Illinois College	Jacksonville, Illinois	Active	
Gamma Phi Society	1833–c. 1840	Colgate University	Hamilton, New York	Inactive	
Gamma Sigma Literary Society	1891	Henderson State University	Arkadelphia, Arkansas	Inactive	
Garland Literary Society		Henderson State University	Arkadelphia, Arkansas	Inactive	
Garland Literary Society	1886	University of Arkansas	Fayetteville, Arkansas	Inactive	
Garnet Society	1866	Lincoln University	Oxford, Pennsylvania	Inactive	
German Verein	1859–1942	German Wallace College	Berea, Ohio	Inactive	(Note: Became the Alpha Omega chapter of Phi Kappa Tau fraternity in 1942.)
Gnothautii Society	1849	Knox College	Galesburg, Illinois	Inactive	
Grady Literary Society	1895	University of Arkansas	Fayetteville, Arkansas	Inactive	
Grinnell Institute	1870	Grinnell College	Grinnell, Iowa	Inactive	
Hamlin Garland	1920–1934	Heidelberg University	Tiffin, Ohio	Inactive	
Hamline Society	1854	Iowa Wesleyan College	Mount Pleasant, Iowa	Inactive	
Harlan Literary Society	1899–1952	Hendrix College	Conway, Arkansas	Inactive	
Henodelphisterian Society	1820	Indiana University Bloomington	Bloomington, Indiana	Inactive	
Hermaean Society	1849–1946	University of Mississippi	Oxford, Mississippi	Inactive	
Hermean Society	1811	University of Pennsylvania	Philadelphia, Pennsylvania	Inactive	
Hermean Society	1845	Geneva College	Beaver Falls, Pennsylvania	Inactive	
Hermesian Literary Society	1888	Ouachita Baptist University	Arkadelphia, Arkansas	Inactive	
**Hermesian Society**	1840	Emory & Henry College	Emory, Virginia	Active	
Hentz Society	1853	LaGrange College	LaGrange, Georgia	Inactive	
Hesperian Society	1857	Ohio Female College	Cincinnati, Ohio	Inactive	
Hesperian Society	1863–1933	University of Iowa	Iowa City, Iowa	Inactive	
Hesperian Society	1912	Heidelberg University	Tiffin, Ohio	Inactive	
Hinman Society	1856	Northwestern University	Evanston, Illinois	Inactive	
Hyperion Society	1855	Marshall University	Huntington, West Virginia	Inactive	
Institute of 1770	1770	Harvard University	Cambridge, Massachusetts	Inactive	
Irving Institute	1864–1929	University of Iowa	Iowa City, Iowa	Inactive	
Irving Literary Society	September 5, 1865	Andalusia College	Pennsylvania	Inactive	
Irving Society	1868–1888	Cornell University	Ithaca, New York	Inactive	(Note: Last documented public meeting was held in May 1887 as a coeducational society. A fraternity later claimed to be the "custodian" of this society and said it carries out private literary exercises within one fraternity house.)
Irving Society	1870	College of Wooster	Wooster, Ohio	Inactive	
Ionian Society	1857	Earlham College	Richmond, Indiana	Inactive	
Jared Eliot Book Collectors and Literary Society (Jared Eliot Association)	1934	Yale University	New Haven, Connecticut	Inactive	
**Jefferson Society**	1825	University of Virginia	Charlottesville, Virginia	Active	
**John Adams Society**	2014	Harvard University	Cambridge, Massachusetts	Active	
Judson Society	1853	LaGrange College	LaGrange, Georgia	Inactive	
L & S (Literature and Science)	1862–1864	Yale University	New Haven, Connecticut	Inactive	
Laurean Society	1876	University of Oregon	Eugene, Oregon	Inactive	
Lee Literary Society	1906	University of Arkansas	Fayetteville, Arkansas	Inactive	
Lehigh Junto	1868	Lehigh University	Bethlehem, Pennsylvania	Inactive	
L'Etoile	1884	Lyon College	Batesville, Arkansas	Inactive	
Licivyronian Society	1839	College of William & Mary	Williamsburg, Virginia	Inactive	
Lincoln Association	1866	Illinois Soldiers College	Fulton, Indiana	Inactive	
Linnean Society	1854	Mount Union College	Alliance, Ohio	Inactive	
**Linonian Society**	1753–1868, 1878–1880, 1904–1906, 19xx ?	Yale University	New Haven, Connecticut	Active	
Literary Adelphi Society	1857	University of Michigan	Ann Arbor, Michigan	Inactive	
Literary Fraternity	1827	Colby College	Waterville, Maine	Inactive	
Literary Society	1859	University of Maryland, College Park	College Park, Maryland	Inactive	
**The Literary Society**	1888	Winthrop University	Rock Hill, South Carolina	Active	
Lyceum Society	1847	Wabash College	Crawfordsville, Indiana	Inactive	
Mathesian Society	1856	Northwestern Christian University	Indianapolis, Indiana	Inactive	
Miami Union Literary Society	1825–1928	Miami University	Oxford, Ohio	Inactive	
**The Mnemosyne Literary and Debate Society**	2026	Knox College (Illinois)	Galesburg, Illinois	Active	
Mu Sigma Rho Literary Society	October 10, 1846 – 1861; October 5, 1866	Richmond College	Richmond, Virginia	Inactive	
Neocosmian Society	1859	Albright College	Reading, Pennsylvania	Inactive	
Neotrophian Society	1867	Bethel College	Russellville, Kentucky	Inactive	
Nu Pi Kappa Society	1828	Kenyon College	Gambier, Ohio	Inactive	
Octave Thanet	1900–1933	University of Iowa	Iowa City, Iowa	Inactive	
Orthopatetic Society	1869	Blackburn College	Carlinville, Illinois	Inactive	
Orophilian Lyceum Society	1850	Alfred University	Alfred, New York	Inactive	
Ossoli Society	1874	Northwestern University	Evanston, Illinois	Inactive	
P. D. A.	1773–1781	College of William & Mary	Williamsburg, Virginia	Inactive	
Parthenian Society	1853	University of Baltimore	Baltimore, Maryland	Inactive	
Parthenon Society	1827	Trinity College	Hartford, Connecticut	Inactive	
Patrick Henry Society	1819–1830, c. 1966	University of Virginia	Charlottesville, Virginia	Inactive	
Peithissophian Society	1825–1891	Rutgers University	New Brunswick, New Jersey	Inactive	
Peithologian Society	1806	Columbia University	New York City, New York	Inactive	
Peithologian Society	1831	Wesleyan University	Middletown, Connecticut	Inactive	
Periclean Literary Society	1900	University of Arkansas	Fayetteville, Arkansas	Inactive	
Periclesian Society	1853	Franklin College	Franklin, Indiana	Inactive	
**Peucinian Society**	1805	Bowdoin College	Brunswick, Maine	Active	
**Phi Alpha Literary Society**	1845	Illinois College	Jacksonville, Illinois	Active	
Phi Alpha Pi Society	1861	Olivet College	Olivet, Michigan	Inactive	
Phi Alpha Society	1854	Central Methodist University	Fayette, Missouri	Inactive	
Phi Beta Kappa Society	1776–1787	College of William & Mary	Williamsburg, Virginia	Inactive	(Note: Phi Beta Kappa was only a private literary society until ca. 1831.)
**Phi Beta Kappa Society**	1780	Yale University	New Haven, Connecticut	Active	
**Phi Beta Kappa Society**	1781	Harvard University	Cambridge, Massachusetts	Active	
**Phi Beta Kappa Society**	1787	Dartmouth College	Hanover, New Hampshire	Active	
**Phi Beta Kappa Society**	1830	Brown University	Providence, Rhode Island	Active	
**Phi Beta Kappa Society**	1817	Union College	Schenectady, New York	Active	
**Phi Beta Kappa Society**	1825	Bowdoin College	Brunswick, Maine	Active	
Phi Delta Society	1834–late 1930s; October 1967–xxxx ?	Mercer University	Macon, Georgia	Inactive	
Phi Delta Society	1839–1863	Oglethorpe University	Brookhaven, Georgia	Inactive	
Phi Delta Society	1840	Western Reserve University	Hudson, Ohio	Inactive	
Phi Delta Society	1868	Berea College	Berea, Kentucky	Inactive	
Phi Gamma Society	1837	College of Charleston	Charleston, South Carolina	Inactive	
Phi Kappa Alpha	1870	Brown University	Providence, Rhode Island	Inactive	
**Phi Kappa Literary Society**	1820	University of Georgia	Athens, Georgia	Active	
Phi Nu Society	1853	MacMurray College	Jacksonville, Illinois	Inactive	
Phi Phi Alpha Society	1842	University of Michigan	Ann Arbor, Michigan	Inactive	
Phi Sigma Nu Society	1803	University of Vermont	Burlington, Vermont	Inactive	
Phi Sigma Society	1849–1934	University of Mississippi	Oxford, Mississippi	Inactive	
Philadelphian Society	1856	Monmouth College	Monmouth, Illinois	Inactive	
Philal-Union Society	c. 1920–c. 1931	Hanover College	Hanover, Indiana	Inactive	(Note: Formed from the merger of the Philalathean Society and the Union Literary Society.)
Philaletha Society	1852	Otterbein College	Westerville, Ohio	Inactive	
Philalethean Literary Society	1913	Taylor University	Upland, Indiana	Inactive	
Philalethean Society	1855	Lawrence University	Appleton, Wisconsin	Inactive	
**Philalethean Society**	1913	Heidelberg University	Tiffin, Ohio	Active	
Philalethic Literary Society	1856	Santa Clara College	Santa Clara, California	Inactive	
Philanthropic Literary Society	1807–1929	Hampden–Sydney College	Hampden Sydney, Virginia	Inactive	(Note: Merged with Union Philosophical Society.)
**Philanthropic Society**	1795	University of North Carolina at Chapel Hill	Chapel Hill, North Carolina	Active	
**Philanthropic Society**	1837	Emory University	Atlanta, Georgia	Active	
Phileans Society	1853	Waynesburg College	Waynesburg, Pennsylvania	Inactive	
Philermenian Society	1794–1866	Brown University	Providence, Rhode Island	Inactive	
Philestorian Debating Society	October 14, 1859	Santa Clara College	Santa Clara, California	Inactive	
Philo-Christomathean Society	1849	Geneva College	Beaver Falls, Pennsylvania	Inactive	
Philo-Franklin Society	1834	Allegheny College	Meadville, Pennsylvania	Inactive	
Philo Literary Society	1797	Jefferson College	Canonsburg, Pennsylvania	Inactive	
Philoclean Society	1825–1892	Rutgers University	New Brunswick, New Jersey	Inactive	
Philocurian Society	1868	Northwestern Christian University	Indianapolis, Indiana	Inactive	
**Philodemic Society**	1830	Georgetown University	Washington, D.C.	Active	
Philokosmian Society	1867	Lebanon Valley College	Annville, Pennsylvania	Inactive	
**Philolexian Society**	1802	Columbia University	New York City, New York	Active	
Philolexian Society	1851	Kalamazoo College	Kalamazoo, Michigan	Inactive	
Philologian Society	1795	Williams College	Williamstown, Massachusetts	Inactive	
Philologian Society	October 8, 1855 – April 22, 1861; October 27, 1867	Richmond College	Richmond, Virginia	Inactive	(Note: Formed by seven former members of the Mu Sigma Rho Society.)
Philologian Society	1870	St. Stephens College	Annandale-on-Hudson, New York	Inactive	
Philological Society	1807	University of Pennsylvania	Philadelphia, Pennsylvania	Inactive	
Philological Society	1839	Indiana Asbury College	Greencastle, Indiana	Inactive	
Philomathean Literary Society	1851–1857	Carson-Newman College	Jefferson City, Tennessee	Inactive	(Note: The society became Phi Mu Delta in 1857.)
Philomathean Literary Society	1888	Ouachita Baptist University	Arkadelphia, Arkansas	Inactive	
**Philomathean Society**	1813	University of Pennsylvania	Philadelphia, Pennsylvania	Active	
Philomathean Society	1828	College of Charleston	Charleston, South Carolina	Inactive	
Philomathean Society	1831	Indiana University	Bloomington, Indiana	Inactive	
Philomathean Society	1832–1891	New York University	New York City, New York	Inactive	
Philomathean Society	1834	Wabash College	Crawfordsville, Indiana	Inactive	
Philalathean Society	1839–c. 1917	Hanover College	Hanover, Indiana	Merged	(Note: This formed from the merger of the Philosophronian and the Whig Societies. It was originally called the Zelomathean but changed its name after one week. The society stopped meeting during World War I. After the war, it merged with the Union Literary Society to form the Philal-Union Society.)
**Philomathean Society**	1842	Erskine College	Due West, South Carolina	Active	
Philomathean Society	1846	Muskingum College	New Concord, Ohio	Inactive	
Philomathean Society	1851	Waynesburg College	Waynesburg, Pennsylvania	Inactive	
Philomathean Society	1852	Hiram College	Hiram, Ohio	Inactive	
**Philomathean Society**	1852	Wesleyan University	Middletown, Connecticut	Active	
Philomathean Society	1856	Willamette University	Salem, Oregon	Inactive	
Philomathean Society	1857	Otterbein College	Westerville, Ohio	Inactive	
Philomathean Society	1860	Milton College	Milton, Wisconsin	Inactive	
Philomathean Society	1866	Union Christian College	Merom, Indiana	Inactive	
Philomathean Society	1868	Iowa State University	Ames, Iowa	Inactive	
Philomathean Society	1869	Tennessee Wesleyan College	Athens, Tennessee	Inactive	
**Philomathean Society**	1871	University of the Pacific	Stockton, California	Active	(Note: This was an organization for women.) (Note: The society changed its name to Phi Lambda Omicron in 1924 after its mission shifted to being a social sorority.)
Philomathean Society	1883	Lyon College	Batesville, Arkansas	Inactive	
Philomathean Society	1928–1928	University of Iowa	Iowa City, Iowa	Inactive	
**Philomathean Society**	1991	Union College	Schenectady, New York	Active	
Philomathesian Society	1827	Kenyon College	Gambier, Ohio	Inactive	
Philomathesian Society	1835	Wake Forest University	Wake Forest, North Carolina	Inactive	
Philomathesian Society	1836	East Tennessee University	Knoxville, Tennessee	Inactive	
Philomathesian Society	1839	Oberlin College	Oberlin, Ohio	Inactive	
Philomathian Society	1852	University of Mississippi	Oxford, Mississippi	Inactive	
Philomathian Society	1854	Bethel College	Russellville, Kentucky	Inactive	
Philomathian Society	1868	Illinois Industrial University	Urbana, Illinois	Inactive	
Philomathic Society	1832–1943	University of Alabama	Tuscaloosa, Alabama	Inactive	
Philomatic Society	1848	Spring Hill College	Mobile, Alabama	Inactive	
Philoneikean Society	1856	Moores Hill College	Evansville, Indiana	Inactive	
Philopaedian Society	January 16, 1841	St. Xavier College	Cincinnati, Ohio	Inactive	
Philopenthean Society	1855	Geneva College	Beaver Falls, Pennsylvania	Inactive	
Philophrenian Society	1850	Columbian College	New York City, New York	Inactive	
Philophrenian Society	1855	George Washington University	Washington, D.C.	Inactive	
Philophronean Society	1851	Otterbein College	Westerville, Ohio	Inactive	
Philosophian Society	1837	Indiana Asbury College	Greencastle, Indiana	Inactive	
Philosophian Society	1846	Wittenberg College	Springfield, Ohio	Inactive	
Philosophian Society	1860	Furman University	Greenville, South Carolina	Inactive	
Philosophian Society	1867	Lincoln University	Oxford, Pennsylvania	Inactive	
Philosophronian Society	1830–1839	Hanover College	Hanover, Indiana	Merged	(Note: When student enrollment decline, it merged with the Whig Society to form the Philalathean Society.)
Philotechnian Society	1795	Williams College	Williamstown, Massachusetts	Inactive	
Philotechnic Society	1870	Louisiana State University	Baton Rouge, Louisiana	Inactive	
Philorhetorian Society	1831	Wesleyan University	Middletown, Connecticut	Inactive	
Philozetian Society	1826	Western Reserve University	Hudson, Ohio	Inactive	
Phoenix Band Society	1856	Earlham College	Richmond, Indiana	Inactive	
Phoenix Society	1814	Hamilton College	Clinton, New York	Inactive	
Phoenix Society	1855	Lawrence University	Appleton, Wisconsin	Inactive	
Photozotean Society	1869	Moores Hill College	Evansville, Indiana	Inactive	
Phreno-Cosmian Society	1857	Baldwin University	Berea, Ohio	Inactive	
Phrenocosmian Society	1852	Free Academy of the City of New York	New York City, New York	Inactive	
Pi Delta Society	1834–c. 1840	Colgate University	Hamilton, New York	Inactive	
**Pi Pi Rho Society**	1929	Illinois College	Jacksonville, Illinois	Active	
Pithonian Society	1850	University of Rochester	Rochester, New York	Inactive	
Platonian Society	1838	Georgetown College	Georgetown, Kentucky	Inactive	
Platonian Society	1849	McKendree College	Lebanon, Illinois	Inactive	
Polemical Society	1776–1782	Rutgers University	New Brunswick, New Jersey	Inactive	
**Polytechnic Literary Society**	1847	The Citadel	Charleston, South Carolina	Active	
Porcellian Society	1791	Harvard University	Cambridge, Massachusetts	Inactive	
Preston Society	1858	Wofford College	Spartanburg, South Carolina	Inactive	
Pronouncing Society	1771	Brown University	Providence, Rhode Island	Inactive	
Psi Gamma Society	1839	Marietta College	Marietta, Ohio	Inactive	
The Pundits	1884	Yale University	New Haven, Connecticut	Active	(Note: Now considered a secret society.)
Pythonian Society	1857	Northwestern Christian University	Indianapolis, Indiana	Inactive	
Reynolds Literary Society	1860	Stockwell Collegiate Institute	Stockwell, Indiana	Inactive	
Rhizomian Society	1858	University of the Pacific	Stockton, California	Inactive	
Robert E. Lee Society	1898–1918	Birmingham–Southern College	Birmingham, Alabama	Inactive	(Note: Absorbed by the Belles Lettres Society when Southern University and Birmingham College merged to form Birmingham-Southern College in 1918.)
Robert E. V. Rice Society	1866	Niagara University	Lewiston, New York	Inactive	
**Roosevelt Society**	2015	University of Virginia	Charlottesville, Virginia	Active	
Ruthean Society	1859	Iowa Wesleyan College	Mount Pleasant, Iowa	Inactive	
St.. Aloysius Philodemics Society	1851	Notre Dame University	Notre Dame, Indiana	Inactive	
St. Joseph Literary Association	September 10, 1866	St. Joseph College	New York	Inactive	
San Jacinto Society	1875	Southwestern University	Georgetown, Texas	Inactive	
Scientific Society	1866	Wilberforce University	Wilberforce, Ohio	Inactive	
Semicentenary Society	1866	Wilberforce University	Wilberforce, Ohio	Inactive	
Sherwood Rhetorical Society	1851	Kalamazoo College	Kalamazoo, Michigan	Inactive	
**Sigma Phi Epsilon Society**	1916	Illinois College	Jacksonville, Illinois	Active	
**Sigma Pi**	1843	Illinois College	Jacksonville, Illinois	Active	
**Signet Society**	1870	Harvard University	Cambridge, Massachusetts	Active	
Sigournean Society	1857	Moores Hill College	Evansville, Indiana	Inactive	
Social Friends Society	1783	Dartmouth College	Hanover, New Hampshire	Inactive	
Society for Inquiry	1824	Colgate University	Hamilton, New York	Inactive	
Society for Progress in Letters	1789–1795	Columbia University	New York City, New York	Inactive	
Society for Religious Inquiry	1835	University of Vermont	Burlington, Vermont	Inactive	
Sodalian Society	1871	Wilberforce University	Wilberforce, Ohio	Inactive	
Sophirodelphian Society	1829–1860s	Maryville College	Maryville, Tennessee	Inactive	
Sophronian Society	1867	Muhlenberg College	Allentown, Pennsylvania	Inactive	
Sophronikopean Society	1859	Missionary Institute	Pennsylvania	Inactive	(Note: Named changed to Clionian Society in 1866.)
Soverville Society	1850	Ohio Female College	Cincinnati, Ohio	Inactive	
Star Society	1855	Antioch College	Yellow Springs, Ohio	Inactive	
Star Society	1859	Adrian College	Adrian, Michigan	Inactive	
Stephen F. Austin Society	1876	Texas A&M University	College Station, Texas	Inactive	
Stonewall Society	1866	Baylor College	Waco, Texas	Inactive	
Students Philomathean Society	1851	Hartsville College	Hartsville, Indiana	Inactive	
Themian Society	1866	Quincy College	Quincy, Massachusetts	Inactive	
Tau Chi Society	1840	College of William & Mary	Williamsburg, Virginia	Inactive	
Tau Theta Kappa Society	1839–c. 1932	Georgetown College	Georgetown, Kentucky	Inactive	
Thalian Society	1839	Oglethorpe University	Brookhaven, Georgia	Active	
Theta Alphea Society	1850	Bucknell University	Lewisburg, Pennsylvania	Inactive	
Theta Epsilon	1894	Maryville College	Maryville, Tennessee	Inactive	
Transylvania Whig Society	1829	Transylvania University	Lexington, Kentucky	Inactive	
Tri Kappa Society	1861	University of Chicago	Chicago, Illinois	Inactive	
Tripartite Union	1848	Lycoming College	Williamsport, Pennsylvania	Inactive	
Union Literary Society	1809	Washington College	Washington, Pennsylvania	Inactive	
Union Literary Society	1830–c. 1917	Hanover College	Hanover, Indiana	Merged	(Note: The society stopped meeting during World War I. After the war, it merged with the Philalathean Society to form the Philal-Union Society.)
Union Literary Society	1836	Muskingum College	New Concord, Ohio	Inactive	
Union Literary Society	1853	Geneva College	Beaver Falls, Pennsylvania	Inactive	
**Union-Philanthropic Society**	1789	Hampden–Sydney College	Hampden Sydney, Virginia	Active	(Note: Originally was called the Union Philosophical Society.)
**Union Philosophical Society**	1789	Dickinson College	Carlisle, Pennsylvania	Active	
Union Philosophical Society	1829	Transylvania University	Lexington, Kentucky	Inactive	
Union Society	1814	Hamilton College	Clinton, New York	Inactive	
Union Society	1851	Waynesburg College	Waynesburg, Pennsylvania	Inactive	
United Brothers Society	1806–1866	Brown University	Providence, Rhode Island	Inactive	
United Fraternity	1786	Dartmouth College	Hanover, New Hampshire	Inactive	
Vesperian Society	1870	Rockford College	Rockford, Illinois	Inactive	
Wayland Society	1870	Brown University	Providence, Rhode Island	Inactive	
Washington Debating Society	c. 1845 – October 10, 1846	Richmond College	Richmond, Virginia	Inactive	
Washington Literary Society	1814	Washington College	Washington, Pennsylvania	Inactive	
**Washington Literary Society and** **Debating Union**	1831–1861, 1865–1929, 1979	University of Virginia	Charlottesville, Virginia	Active	(Note: The society went dormant during the Civil War and after the 1929 Stock Market crash.)
Washington Society	1854	Bethel College	Russellville, Kentucky	Inactive	
Webster Society	1853	Franklin College	Franklin, Indiana	Inactive	
Webster Society	1859	University of Michigan	Ann Arbor, Michigan	Inactive	
Whig Society	1834–1839	Hanover College	Hanover, Indiana	Merged	(Note: Formed as Chrestomathean but its name was changed shortly afterward. When student enrollment declined, it merged with the Philosophronian Society to form the Philalathean Society.)
Whitby	1913–1928	University of Iowa	Iowa City, Iowa	Inactive	
William Dodd Society	2024	Florida State University	Tallahassee, Florida	Active	
Zelosophic Society	1829	University of Pennsylvania	Philadelphia, Pennsylvania	Inactive	
Zenobian Society	December 9, 1869 – June 10, 1970	University of Minnesota	Minneapolis, Minnesota	Inactive	
Zetelethean	1880–1917	Hanover College	Hanover, Indiana	Inactive	
Zetagathea Society	1845	Ohio Wesleyan University	Delaware, Ohio	Inactive	
Zetalethean Society	1867	Simpson College	Indianola, Iowa	Inactive	
Zetagathian Society	1861–1933	University of Iowa	Iowa City, Iowa	Inactive	

== United States women's literary societies ==
Active societies are indicated in bold. Inactive societies and institutions are in italics.

Society	Founding date and range	Institution	Location	Status	References
Alpha Clionian	1872	Geneseo Normal School	Geneseo, New York	Active	(Note: Was formed as a literary society. Around 1902, it became a traditional sorority with the Greek letters Phi Kappa Pi but still uses the name Alpha Clio.)
Adelphian Literary Society	1893–1953	Woman's College of the University of North Carolina	Greensboro, North Carolina	Inactive	
Alethian Society	1923–1953	Woman's College of the University of North Carolina	Greensboro, North Carolina	Inactive	
**Ars Sapientiae**	2024	Lehigh University	Bethlehem, Pennsylvania	Active	
Clever Girls Society	1844	Albion College	Albion, Michigan	Inactive	
Corinnean Society		Ouachita Baptist University	Arkadelphia, Arkansas	Inactive	
Cornelian Literary Society	1893–1953	Woman's College of the University of North Carolina	Greensboro, North Carolina	Inactive	
Curious Literary Society	1855	Milwaukee Female College	Milwaukee, Wisconsin	Inactive	
Dikean Literary Society	1918–1953	Woman's College of the University of North Carolina	Greensboro, North Carolina	Inactive	
Euphrosynean Literary Society	1892	Newberry College	Newberry, South Carolina	Inactive	
**Euphrosynean Society**	1924	University of South Carolina	Columbia, South Carolina	Active	
Franklin Literary Society	1822–1921	Randolph–Macon College	Ashland, Virginia	Inactive	(Note: The Franklin Debating Society is a modern group that is active on campus as of 2023.)
Germanae Sodales Society	1859	Hillsdale College	Hillsdale, Michigan	Inactive	
Hypatian Society	1915–1970s	University of South Carolina	Columbia, South Carolina	Inactive	
Jefferson Literary Society	1902–1921	Randolph–Macon College	Ashland, Virginia	Inactive	(Note: Formed by members of the Franklin Literary Society to create competition after the Washington Literary Society ceased to exist.)
Ladies' Literary Society	1834	Oberlin College	Oberlin, Ohio	Inactive	
Ladies Literary Society	1852	Milton College	Milton, Wisconsin	Inactive	
Ladies Literary Union	1857	Hillsdale College	Hillsdale, Michigan	Inactive	
**The Mnemosyne Literary and Debate Society**	2026	Knox College (Illinois)	Galesburg, Illinois	Active	
Kappa Iota Literary Society	October 12, 1921 – 1950	Alma College	Alma, Michigan	Inactive	(Note: In 1950, the society changed its mission from academic to a social sorority and changed its name to Kappa Iota.)
**The Philaletheis Society**	1865	Vassar College	Poughkeepsie, New York	Active	(Note: Originally called Philalethean Society)
Philomathean	1891	Henderson State University	Arkadelphia, Arkansas	Inactive	
Polymnian Society		Ouachita Baptist University	Arkadelphia, Arkansas	Inactive	
Upsilon Phi Literary Society		Henderson State University	Arkadelphia, Arkansas	Inactive	
**Washington Literary Society**	1833–1899, 1940s	Randolph–Macon College	Ashland, Virginia	Active	

== See also ==
- College literary society
- Literary society
