= University of Massachusetts Debate Society =

Collegiate parliamentary debate organization

- Formation: 1909
- President: Mari Chaparro
- Affiliations: University of Massachusetts

The University of Massachusetts Debate Society (UMDS), formerly known as the University of Massachusetts Debate Union, is a collegiate parliamentary debate organization at the University of Massachusetts Amherst. The society traces its origins to 1909, when organized intercollegiate debate activities were first documented at Massachusetts Agricultural College, the predecessor of UMass Amherst.

The debate program was historically administered through the university's Department of Speech and participated in intercollegiate competitions, public debates, and educational outreach activities. During the twentieth century, the organization also hosted debate tournaments for secondary school and university students.

The modern Debate Society was re-established in 2015 and participates in tournaments organized by the American Parliamentary Debate Association (APDA).

== Mission statement ==
The purpose of this organization is to advance the growth of its members in the areas of critical analysis, argumentation, and oratory through competition in intercollegiate parliamentary debate, while providing an inclusive and supportive team environment at no cost to its members.

== Other historic collegiate debating organizations ==
- Amherst Political Union of Amherst College
- The Berkeley Forum of University of California, Berkeley
- The Philolexian Society of Columbia University
- The Philomathean Society of the University of Pennsylvania
- The American Whig-Cliosophic Society of Princeton University
- The Jefferson Literary and Debating Society of the University of Virginia
- The Union-Philanthropic (Literary) Society of Hampden-Sydney College
- The Dialectic and Philanthropic Societies of the University of North Carolina at Chapel Hill
- The Demosthenian Literary Society of the University of Georgia
- The Euphradian Society of the University of South Carolina
- The Yale Political Union of Yale University
- The Philodemic Society of Georgetown University
