= Amherst Political Union =

The Amherst Political Union (APU) is a student debating club at Amherst College. Founded in 1939 by Robert Morgenthau '41 and Richard Wilbur '42 and re-founded in the spring of 2010, the club aims to bring speakers on contemporary political thought to Amherst in a nonpartisan and unbiased manner.

== Mission statement ==
The Amherst Political Union prides itself on its nonpartisan structure and serves as an environment of engagement for individuals with varied political views. Since its founding, the Political Union has sought to fight the political apathy that plagues many other colleges by engaging members of the Amherst College campus in productive conversations relating to salient and pressing political issues.

== Notable Recent Speakers Include ==
- Prime Minister of Pakistan Shaukat Aziz
- Former RNC Chairman Michael Steele
- Harvard Law Professor Lawrence Lessig
- Senator George Mitchell
- Journalist Mona Eltahawy
- Former Presidential Candidate Ralph Nader
- Former CIA Director John Deutch
- Congressman Jamie Raskin
- Congressman Tom Davis
- Libertarian Doug Bandow

== Other historic collegiate debating organizations ==
- The Berkeley Forum of University of California, Berkeley
- The Philomathean Society of the University of Pennsylvania
- The Philolexian Society of Columbia University
- The American Whig-Cliosophic Society of Princeton University
- The Jefferson Literary and Debating Society of the University of Virginia
- The Union-Philanthropic (Literary) Society of Hampden-Sydney College
- The Dialectic and Philanthropic Societies of the University of North Carolina at Chapel Hill
- The Demosthenian Literary Society of The University of Georgia in Athens
- The Euphradian Society of University of South Carolina
- The Yale Political Union of Yale University
- The Philodemic Society of Georgetown University
