= Eumenean Society =

Literary society at Davidson College, North Carolina, US

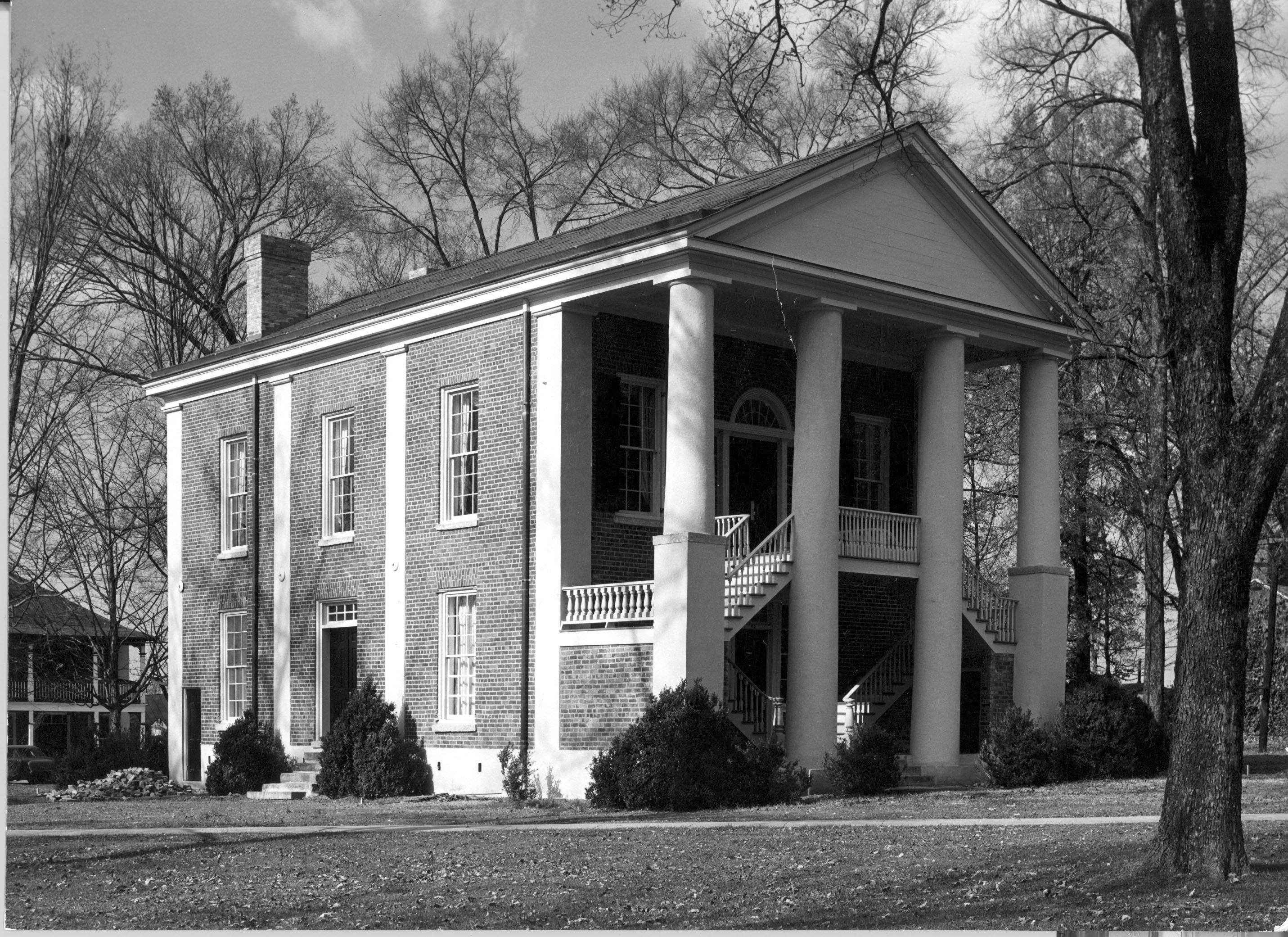
- Eumenean Hall
- Founded: April 14, 1837; 189 years ago Davidson College
- Type: Literary
- Affiliation: Independent
- Status: Active
- Emphasis: Debating
- Scope: Local
- Motto: Pulchrum Est Colere Mentem "It is noble to cultivate the mind" Kalon Aletheia Kai Monomon "Truth is lasting and beautiful"
- Colors: Pink
- Chapters: 1
- Headquarters: Davidson, North Carolina; United States

The Eumenean Society is a literary society at Davidson College in Davidson, North Carolina, United States. It was founded on April 14, 1837.

== History ==
The Eumenean Society was established as the Polemic Debating Society on April 14, 1837 at Davidson College in Davidson, North Carolina. This first student organization on campus and was created for "the acquirement of literary knowledge, the promotion of virtue, and the cultivation of social harmony and friendship.” It was primarily a debating society but was a secret society.

The society offered debating, declaiming, and an orator's medal. By 1849, it had a library with 1,200 volumes. On May 9, 1857, they purged their library by burning the works of Thomas Paine, Jean-Jacques Rousseau, and Voltaire.

The society debated with its campus counterpart, the Philanthropic Society. Some of the debate topics included “Ought students to associate with ladies while pursuing their studies?”, “Ought the Indians to be driven from the land they occupy?”, "Was John Wilkes Booth a Patriot", "Was the Reconstruction of the Southern States Justifiable", "Was the Introduction of Slavery into the United States Beneficial to the Human Race", and “Can there be a greater knowledge of the country obtained by traveling or by the study of geography?”

All students on campus were members of one of these two literary societies, which were the center of campus life. The societies operated as the student government and promoted brotherhood, similarly to a fraternity.

Eumenean did not meet between April 19, 1861, and February 13, 1862, because of the Civil War. With reduced numbers, the society operated through February 1865 and, then, went inactive. It was reestablished in March 1866.

The importance of the campus debating societies wanned in the later 19th and early 20th centuries. In 1907, the college started participating in intercollegiate debating, ending the two societies' control of campus debating. In 1920, only 35 percent of Davidson's students belonged to one of the two societies, which were facing competition from traditional fraternities. To attract interest, the society started bringing speakers to campus and hosted debating and oratory contests.

== Symbols ==
The Eumenean Society's Latin motto is Pulchrum Est Colere Mentem or "It is noble to cultivate the mind". Its Greek motto is Καλόν ή άλήθεια καί μόνιμον or Kalon Aletheia Kai Monomon or "Truth is lasting and beautiful".

The society's color is pink, giving Davidson College one of its original colors, with the other (blue) coming from the Philanthropic Society. In its early years, Eumenean Society members wore a pink ribbon on their coat collar at graduation. In the 1840s, this changed to a medal that was shaped like a crescent with a chain from both ends that connected to a pink ribbon; this was worn on the right coat lapel. This medal evolved into the society's modern pin.

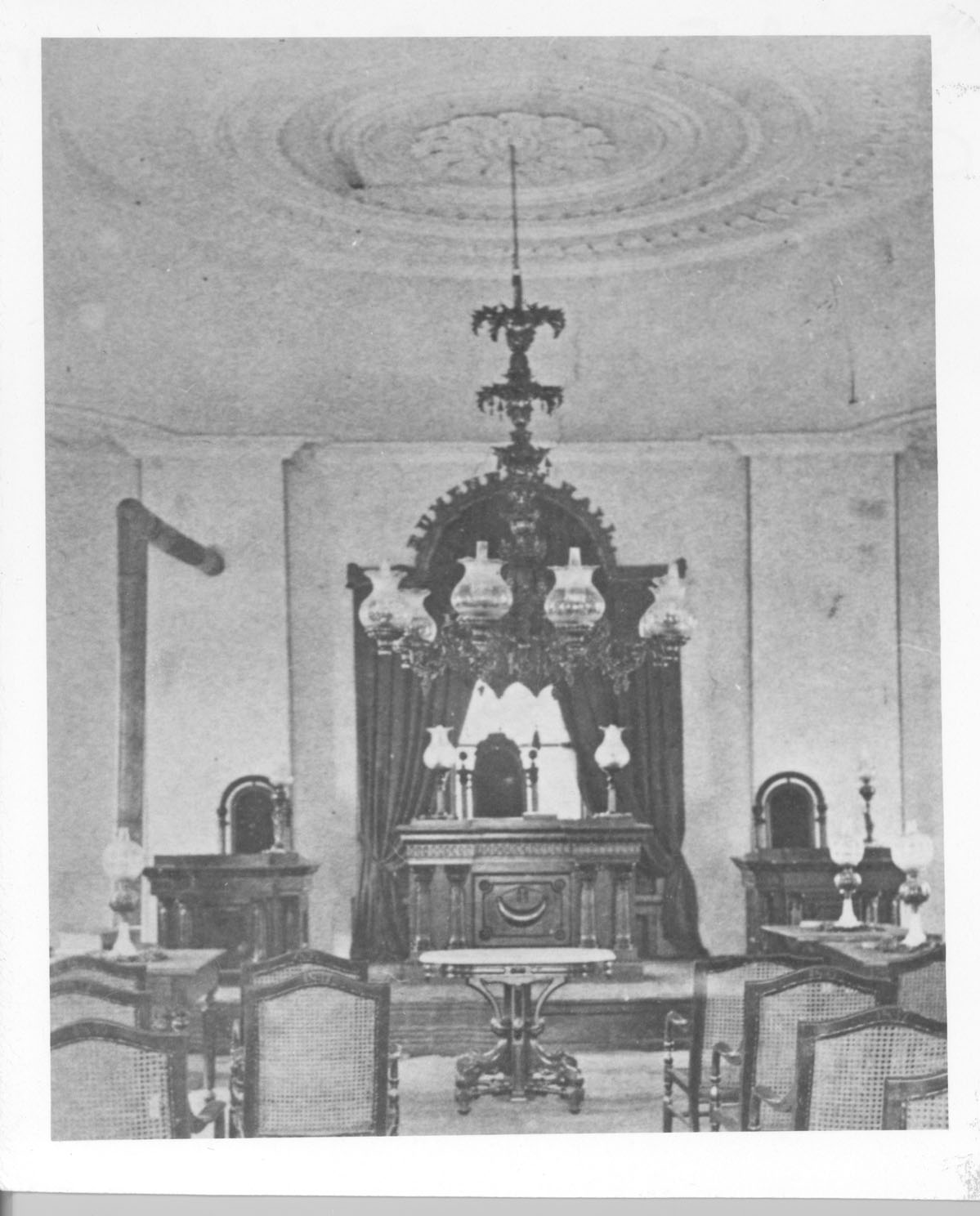
Eumenean Hall Interior

== Eumenean Hall ==
Originally, the society met in "Professor Sparrow’s classroom". Its members approved a motion to "attempt to erect a Society Hall" on November 12, 1842. Because the Philanthropic Society also wanted a hall, the two groups collaborated to design buildings that would be "alike in size, material, and magnificence",’ with a budget of $1,500 each. The societies selected sites that faced each other on December 14, 1848. Construction followed with contractors Lewis Dinkins and Daniel Alexander.

Eumenean Hall was dedicated in November 1849. Its cost was $2,500 ($87,940 in 2022 money), with the college helping to cover overages. The hall is a two-story brick building in the form of a Greek temple, with Doric columns. Its furnishing include some of the society's original furniture, including a large desk and chair with the emblem of the society, inscribed “Eumenean Hall, 1837, and two smaller flanking desks with chairs.

The building was placed on the National Historic Register in 1972. It was named a Charlotte Mecklenburg Historic Site in 1976. Today, it is still the meeting place of the society and is also used for classes.

== Notable members ==
- Henry Gaston Bunn, Chief Justice of the Arkansas Supreme Court
- Woodrow Wilson (1873), President of the United States

== See also ==
- List of college literary societies
