= Phi Kappa Alpha =

American literary fraternity (1870–1880)

- ΦΚΑ
- Founded: 1870; 156 years ago Brown University
- Type: Social
- Affiliation: Independent
- Status: Merged
- Successor: Beta Theta Pi
- Emphasis: Literary
- Scope: Regional
- Motto: Φως και ΑληΘεια (Note: Translates to "Light and Truth")
- Symbol: Book
- Chapters: 2
- Members: 200 lifetime
- Headquarters: United States

Phi Kappa Alpha (ΦΚΑ) was an American college literary society and social fraternity. It was established in 1870 at Brown University in Providence, Rhode Island. It had a second chapter at the University of Rochester in Rochester, New York. The society went inactive when it merged with Beta Theta Pi in 1880.

== History ==
Phi Kappa Alpha originated as two independent college literary societies. The Wayland Literary Society was established in 1870 at Brown University in Providence, Rhode Island. Its founders included H. S. Babcock, William G. Brown, Charles A. Caldwell, V. F. Horton, H. W. Parker, A. Scott, Thomas Seymour, Charles Sterne, and others.

In 1873, the Wayland Literary Society merged with the Literary Union of the University of Rochester in Rochester, New York. The merger created a new regional group called Sigma Phi, which intended to have the characteristics of both open and secret societies. The name change was a reflection of the group's decision to adopt the practice of chapters from Greek lettered college fraternities. In The Greek-Letter Societies (1879), Albert Poole Jacobs described Phi Kappa Alpha as an "anti-secret society".

After discovering that another national organization was already using the name Sigma Phi, the society changed its name to Phi Kappa Alpha in 1874. The Brown Chapter of Phi Kappa Alpha was incorporated by the Rhode Island legislature on June 2, 1876.

Phi Kappa Alpha held an annual convention in Rochester, New York, on April 25 and 26, 1877. Delegates from several colleges were present, suggesting the society had added at least one other chapter. The convention included literary exercises and an oration on "The Despotism Theory" by Rev. J. K. Wilson of Nyack, New York. The next convention was held in Providence, Rhode Island, on April 26, 1878.

Phi Kappa Alpha had initiated around 200 members in 1879. The Rochester chapter closed in 1870. In 1880, the Brown chapter became the Kappa chapter of Beta Theta Pi.

== Symbols ==
Phi Kappa Alpha's badge was a three-sided shield, bounded by circular arches. The top arch included the college name, while the shield bore the Greek letters "ΦΚΑ" below an open book. Its motto was Φως και ΑληΘεια.

== Chapters ==
The following are the known chapters of Phi Kappa Alpha.

Chapter	Charter date and range	Institution	Location	Status	Ref.
Alpha	1870-1880	Brown University	Providence, Rhode Island	Merged (ΒΘΠ)	
Beta	1870-1879	University of Rochester	Rochester, New York	Inactive	

== See also ==
- College literary societies
- List of college literary societies
- List of social fraternities
