= Gamma Nu =

Literary society at Illinois College

- ΓΝ
- Founded: 1897; 128 years ago Illinois College
- Type: Literary
- Affiliation: Independent
- Status: Active
- Scope: Local
- Motto: "Know Thyself"
- Colors: Red and White
- Chapters: 1
- Nickname: Nuers
- Headquarters: Illinois College; Lower Baxter; 1101 West College Avenue; Jacksonville, Illinois 62650; United States

Gamma Nu Literary Society (ΓΝ) is a collegiate literary society for male students at Illinois College in Jacksonville, Illinois, United States.

== History ==
The Gamma Nu Literary Society was founded in the fall of 1897 at Illinois College. At the time, the college's two literary societies had membership limits that excluded many students. Freshman W. H. Cocking got the idea to start a new literary society from his former high school teacher, Virginia Graves, after he did not get into Sigma Pi or Phi Alpha. He shared his idea with friends W. P. Duncan, A. D. Duff, Arthur E. Sneeden, and Delbert F. Yocom.

After consulting the freshman advisor, Professor John M. Clapp, the five founders held an organizational meeting for their fellow freshmen in the old chapel hall of Sturtevant on October 17, 1897. There was unanimous agreement to form a new literary society. Cocking was appointed chairman of a committee to draft the society's constitution and bylaws.

On October 22, 1897, the group met to adopt the constitution and bylaws and to elect officers. Cocking and fifteen students signed the constitution as the charter members of Gamma Nu:

- John J. Bayne
- Francis C. Brewer
- Francis William Bristow
- John M. Clapp
- William Henry Cocking
- George Dirreen
- W. P. Duncan
- A. D. Duff
- Francis T. Finney
- Andrew J. Goodelll
- Thomas V. Harper
- Arthur Thurman Lucas
- Arthur E. Sneeden
- George H. Stacy
- J. B. Thorton
- Delbert F. Yocom

Duff was elected president and Sneeden was chosen as secretary. Cocking, Lucas, and Stacy were asked to find an appropriate name for the society. Gamma Nu held its first official meeting on November 5, 1897, in Phi Alpha Hall. The debated issue was "Resolved that Co-Education is Beneficial".

In February 1898, Gamma Nu began meeting on the second floor of Beecher Hall in a former library room. However, the two pre-existing literary societies did not include Gamma Nu in their debating schedule. Gamma Nu went dormant during the 1901-02 academic year when the college's enrollment dwindled.

Gamma Nu was reorganized in April 1922. Its sister organization is Gamma Delta. It is housed in Lower Baxter Hall on the Illinois campus. In the early 2010s, the society struggled to recruit and retain members, being reduced to as few as four active members.

== Symbols ==
Gamma Nu's motto is "Gnothi Seauton" or "Know Thyself". Its colors are red and white. Its members are referred to as "Nuers".

== Activities ==
The society combines fraternal, literary, and social activities. It hosts literary productions, social events, and charitable activities. Literary activities include compositions, debates, dramatic monologues, essays, oration, and readings.

== Chapter misconduct ==
In 1995, the Illinois College dean of students raided the Gamma Nu hall and videotaped members drinking beer and hazing pledges. The society was banned from campus for four years.

== See also ==
- College literary societies
- List of college literary societies
