= The Daily Pennsylvanian =

Student newspaper in Philadelphia, Pennsylvania

- Cover of The Daily Pennsylvanian (February 8, 2017), highlighting Joe Biden's new job at the University of Pennsylvania.
- Type: Daily student newspaper
- Format: Broadsheet
- School: University of Pennsylvania
- Owner(s): The Daily Pennsylvanian, Inc.
- President: Neema Baddam
- Editor-in-chief: Ethan Young (The Daily Pennsylvanian); Nishanth Bhargava (34th Street); Jack Kramer (Under the Button)
- Managing editor: Jasmine Ni
- News editor: Isha Chitirala; Finn Ryan
- Opinion editor: Ingrid Holmquist
- Founded: December 15, 1885; 140 years ago (as The Pennsylvanian)
- Headquarters: Philadelphia, Pennsylvania
- Circulation: 3,000
- Website: thedp.com
- Free online archives: library.upenn.edu

The Daily Pennsylvanian, Inc. is the independent student media organization of the University of Pennsylvania. The DP, Inc. publishes a newspaper, The Daily Pennsylvanian, the 34th Street Magazine, and the satirical publication Under the Button. It is published entirely by Penn undergraduates and is editorially and financially independent from the university.

== History ==
The Daily Pennsylvanian was founded in 1885 as a successor to the University Magazine, a publication by the Philomathean Society. In 1894, the paper began publishing daily, and remained so until it paused publication in May 1943 due to World War II. It resumed publication in November 1945. In 1962, after a feud with the University of Pennsylvania Student Government Association over a critical editorial led to the Association withdrawing its recognition and subsidies for the paper, the DP became independent. That same year, the organization accepted its first woman staffer, Sharon Lee Ribner. The university's alternative women weekly, the Pennsylvanian News, ended publication in 1964. In 1968, the 34th Street magazine, the publication's arts and culture magazine, was founded. Under the Button, the DP's satirical publication, was created out of 34th Street in 2008.

In 1984, the Daily Pennsylvanian incorporated itself, becoming fully editorially and financially independent of the University of Pennsylvania. In 2014, the paper reduced its printing frequency, dropping its Friday issue. After the onset of the COVID-19 pandemic in March of 2020, the DP ceased its print publication for the first time since World War II. In 2021, the DP announced it would maintain printing the further-reduced printing schedule it adopted during the pandemic.

== Organization ==
The Daily Pennsylvanian is published in print weekly on Thursdays and daily online when the university is in session. The organization consists of an editorial arm, headed by the executive editor, and a business arm, headed by the business manager. Both the executive editor and the business manager report to the publication's president. The executive editor oversees The Daily Pennsylvanian newspaper, the 34th Street magazine (which is published in print monthly), and Under the Button, along with other production teams. Each publication is overseen by its own editor-in-chief and has its own staff. Today the newspaper's budget is funded primarily through the sale of advertising by professional and student staff.

It has received various collegiate journalism awards, including several National Pacemaker Awards from the Associated College Press. The DP was ranked "the most read" college newspaper by The Princeton Review in 1990, 1997,1998, and 2001.

== Notable former staff members ==
Alumni of The Daily Pennsylvanian have gone on to careers in academia, politics, and journalism.
