= Harlan Literary Society =

Student group at Hendrix College, Arkansas, US

- Founded: 1889; 137 years ago Hendrix College
- Type: Literary
- Affiliation: Independent
- Status: Defunct
- Scope: Local
- Motto: "Let us so live, that the world will mourn us dead"
- Publication: Hendrix College Mirror
- Chapters: 1
- Headquarters: Conway, Arkansas; United States

The Harlan Literary Society was a student organization at the Central Collegiate Institute (now Hendrix College) in Altus, Arkansas. The college moved to Conway, Arkansas shortly after the society was formed. The society was established in 1889 and operated until 1932.

== History ==
The Haland Literary was founded in 1889 at the Central Collegiate Institute in Altus, Arkansas. The school was renamed Hendrix College on June 10, 1889, and it relocated in 1890 to Conway, Arkansas. George C. Millar, a professor at the school, and George H. Burr created this college literary society.

Similar to college literary societies elsewhere, the Harlan Literary Society was a social organization aimed at developing a distinct identity in campus life and promoting the tenets of higher education.

The Harlan Literary Society rivaled the Franklin Literary Society, previously established at the Central Institute. The rivalry meant that male students identified as either a Harlan or a Franklin, reflecting a larger trend of competition among college literary societies during this period. These two societies engaged in literary and oratory competitions with each other, but together, they published the Hendrix College Mirror, a monthly newspaper that started circulation in 1890. Women at Hendrix College could join a third literary society, the Hypatians.

The Harlan Literary Society disbanded in 1932.

== Symbols ==
The Harlan Literary Society used the motto "Let us so live, that the world will mourn us dead".
