= Eucleian Society =

Literary society at New York University

- Eucleian Society crest, 1850
- Founded: 1832; 194 years ago New York University
- Type: Literary
- Affiliation: Independent
- Status: Active
- Scope: Local
- Patron Greek deity: Eukleia
- Publication: The Knickerbocker, The Medley, and The Geyser
- Chapters: 1
- Former name: Adelphic Society
- Headquarters: New York City, New York; United States

The Eucleian Society is a student literary society begun at New York University in 1832. According to New York University records, it ceased to exist around the 1940s; however, it was revived in 2017.

The society was dedicated to furthering the literary arts. Members held hour-long debates, preceded by readings of essays, orations, and poems. The Eucleian Society published orations and poems delivered by guest speakers at annual or anniversary meetings. In the 20th century, the Eucleians published three literary magazines: The Knickerbocker, The Medley, and The Geyser.

== Origins ==
Eucleian Meeting Parlor, 1830s

Sixteen students formed the Adelphic Society at New York University in 1832. Its purpose was "the cultivation of oratory and debate among its members". After debate, the society's was changed to Eucleian Society in honor of Eukleia, the goddess of repute, glory and war.

Eucleian Society's rival was the Philomathean Society. While both societies forbade membership in their rival society, early records show that members were sometimes punished when discovered to be holding mutual membership and a few resigned to join the rival society.

The university gave the society its rooms at the Main University Building. The society also had its own library. A. Ogden Butler and family established a trust for the society, providing it with a stable source of funding.

In the late 1930s and 1940s, the society became increasingly separate from the university despite having on-campus accommodations. Its membership dwindled in the 1940s as a result of World War II. Another cause for Eucleian's lower profile seems to have been the perception of elitism by other NYU students. A quip in a yearbook of the era describes Eucleian as having a membership that includes “John Quincy Adams, The Rockefellers, and that crowd”. (The organization did consist largely of the social "elite" of the time.)

This alleged snobbery also became a theme of self-effacing humor in the diminishing external publications of the society in this era; the society refers to itself, and presumably Andiron Club as "the reclusive old Establishment" in a 1930s NYU yearbook. This tongue-in-cheek reference had to do with the club not taking part as a unit in spirited student games, competitions, and hazing of freshmen that occurred in the early fall at NYU.

According to New York University records, the Eucleian Society ceased to exist around the 1940s. In 2017, the society was revived by MFA graduates of the NYU Creative Writing Program, with the premise of continuing the tradition of intellectual exploration and literary discussion in an inclusive and welcoming atmosphere. The revived society is open to both NYU alumni and current students.

== Activities ==
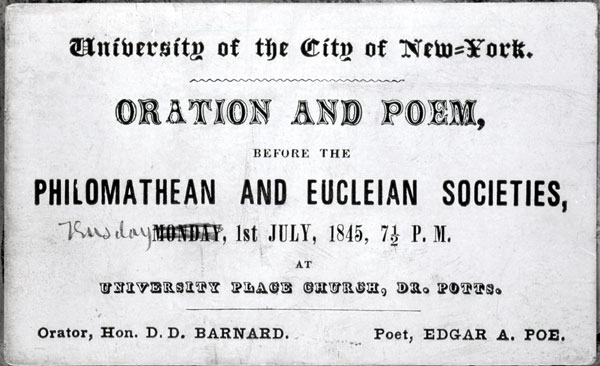
Eucleian and Philomathean joint meeting, Edgar Allan Poe as lecturer 1840s

The Eucleians hosted open forums for important topics of the day, inviting lecturers of great popularity and fame. Edgar Allan Poe was a guest reciter at at least one Eucleian and Philomathean society joint meeting. Politics, current affairs, literature (especially the Gothic and Romantic popular in the era), and university events seems to have been the most popular topics for internal essays, orations, and discussions. Until the turn of the 20th century, officers of the Eucleians also gave public speeches at commencement, apparently occupying a central position in those functions.

In the 20th century, the Eucleians published three literary magazines: The Knickerbocker, The Medley, and The Geyser. The Knickerbocker, although bearing the same title as the commercial magazine The Knickerbocker launched in 1833, was a student magazine launched in the turn of the 20th century and only published twice, March 1900 and January 1901.

== Notable members ==
- John Harvey Kellogg, director of the Battle Creek Sanitarium and founder of cereal that became Kellogg's
- Walter Reed, U.S. Army physician who led the team that confirmed the theory that yellow fever is transmitted by a mosquito
- Frederic Tuten, novelist
