= Philomathean Society (New York University) =

American college literary and debate society

- Philomathean Society crest, 1850
- Founded: October 1832; 192 years ago New York University
- Type: Literary
- Affiliation: Independent
- Status: Defunct
- Emphasis: Debate
- Scope: Local
- Chapters: 1
- Headquarters: New York City, New York; United States

The Philomathean Society at New York University was a student society that was founded at New York University. (The society shared its name with other college societies including the Philomathean Society of the University of Pennsylvania.) This society existed from October 1832 to 1891.

== History ==
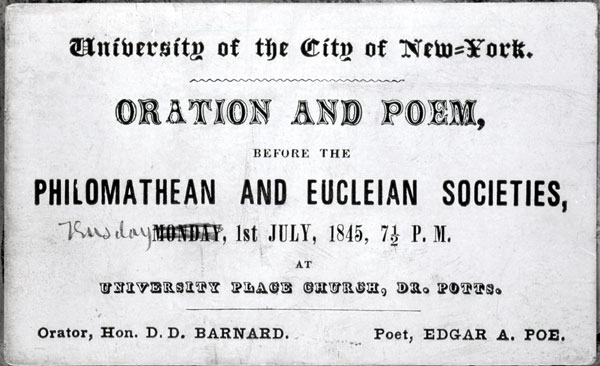
Eucleian and Philomathean joint meeting, Daniel D. Barnard and Edgar Allan Poe as lecturers in 1845

In October 1832, twelve students began the Philomathean Society at New York University. The society's rival was the Eucleian Society. While both societies forbade membership in their rival society, early records show that early members were sometimes expelled or resigned to join the rival society.

Student societies such as the Philomathean Society collected their own libraries and augmented the curriculum. Literary and debate societies offered a departure from the learn-by-rote instruction that prevailed in much of university instruction. The Philomathean Society provided its membership at NYU with a library and augmented student instruction. The university gave the society its own rooms at the Main University Building, which was "fitted up in a style of taste and elegance highly creditable to the young gentlemen members."

One early lecturer became a very popular figure with the society. Edgar Allan Poe was a repeated guest of the Philomathean Society and the Eucleian Society, and lived on the Square.

The society died in 1891.

== Symbols ==
Starting in 1833, the society had a badges that its members were required to wear at all events.
