= Philomathean Society =

Literary society at the University of Pennsylvania

- Founded: October 2, 1813; 213 years ago University of Pennsylvania
- Type: Literary
- Affiliation: Independent
- Status: Active
- Scope: Local
- Motto: Sic itur ad astra "Thus we proceed to the stars"
- Publication: Philomel, Autophage
- Chapters: 1
- Nickname: Philo
- Headquarters: Fourth Floor, College Hall; Philadelphia, Pennsylvania; United States
- Website: www.philomathean.org

Philomathean Society /ˌfaɪloʊˈmeɪθiən/ of the University of Pennsylvania is a collegiate literary society, one of the oldest student groups at the university, and one of the oldest continuously-existing collegiate literary societies in the United States. (Note: Columbia University's Philolexian Society was founded in 1802. Further, the Union-Philanthropic Society asserts continuous existence since 1789 and the American Whig-Cliosophic Society draws its history to 1769; both claims are disputed by the Philomatheans because the present societies are mergers of two other societies and thus represent new entities, founded in 1929 and 1928, respectively.) Founded in 1813, its goal is "to promote the learning of its members and to increase the academic prestige of the University."

== History ==
Philomathean Society graduation diploma for Isaac Norton Jr., 1858.

Philomathean Society, was founded on October 2, 1813, by all thirteen members of the junior class, its original purpose being "the advancement of learning;" a counterweight and complement to Penn's academic coursework. In the first meeting, the title of Moderator was chosen for the Society’s presiding officer; two Censores Morum were appointed by the third meeting, who were given the responsibility, maintained to this day, of fining members for various real or imaginary infractions. Philo’s first meeting was on Friday night, at which time it would remain up to the present day. Minutes of the Society’s Meetings have been kept (relatively) faithfully in large leather-bound volumes since the first Meeting. Members still sign the Recorder’s Roll upon their initiation into the Society, following the tradition started by the founders. Early meetings were dominated by spirited debates and literary exercises where members would present original research, essays, or literary productions; both practices have continued through the present day.

When the University of Pennsylvania moved its campus from Ninth Street to West Philadelphia in 1872, four rooms at the top of College Hall were specifically built for the use of the Society and its rival Zelosophic Society. After the first collapse of the Zelosophic Society in 1872, the former Zelo rooms reverted to Philo.

The Society is credited with helping to found entire academic departments, including American Civilization, Comparative Literature, and History of Science, and many campus groups and publications, including the Daily Pennsylvanian and the Mask and Wig Club.

Philomathean Society meeting room, circa 1913.

In 1858, the Society published the first complete English translation of the Rosetta Stone. The work was performed solely by three undergraduate members, Charles R. Hale, S. Huntington Jones, and Henry Morton. The translation quickly sold out two editions and was internationally hailed as a monumental work of scholarship. In 1988, the British Museum bestowed the honor of including the Philomathean Rosetta Stone Report in its select bibliography of the most important works ever published on the Rosetta Stone. The Philomathean Society maintains a full-scale cast of the stone in its meeting room, along with several original lithograph prints of the report.

In 1916, Philo became the first Penn group to require its members to take an oath not to discriminate based on race, creed, and religion; in 1948 the Society voted to admit women as full members, prompting the headline "Philo hits rock bottom, admits women". The Society vehemently defended the decision more than 25 years before women were admitted to the university proper.

In 1927, overcrowding at the university led the Philos to agree to vacate their space in College Hall in exchange for temporary quarters in Houston Hall until more class space could be found. Houston Hall was not an ideal location: space constraints and building policy, especially the 11:30 p.m. curfew, severely limited Philo traditions. As a result, Society membership decreased, a trend further exacerbated by the outbreak of World War II, when Houston Hall was taken over by the U.S. Navy as part of its officer training program, and former Philo rooms were requisitioned for storage. The Society had dwindled to a single member, Hilary Putnam, who tried to preserve the Philomathean customs and arranged informal meetings in members' apartments. After the war, the Society held more formal meetings and grew in membership, but it was not until 1951, under the direction of Moderator Charles Fine Ludwig, that the old pre-war customs were revived. Ludwig re-acquired the Philomathean archives and reintroduced academic attire, consistent meeting minutes, a regular literary exercise, and an official lecture series, among many other Philomathean customs. Ludwig also established the tradition of Philo's graduates, or "senior members", participating in the Society's activities and taking an ongoing interest in the welfare of the Society.

Finally, in 1969, after a determined campaign of lobbying university administrators for permission and senior members for donations, the Society returned to its beloved Philomathean Halls on the fourth floor of College Hall, where it has remained (with brief absences for maintenance) until the present day.

== Symbols ==
The name Philomathean is derived from the Greek philomath, which means "a lover of learning." The motto of the Philomathean Society is Sic itur ad astra (Latin for "thus we proceed to the stars").

Philo intermittently publishes Philomel, a literary magazine. Its nickname is Philo.

== Present activities ==
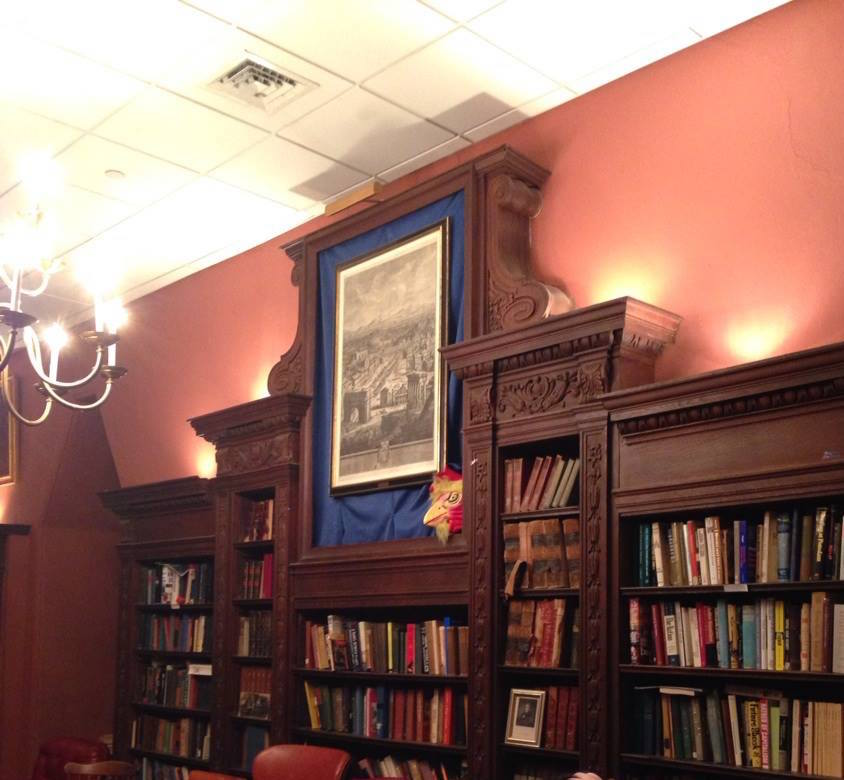
Philomathean library

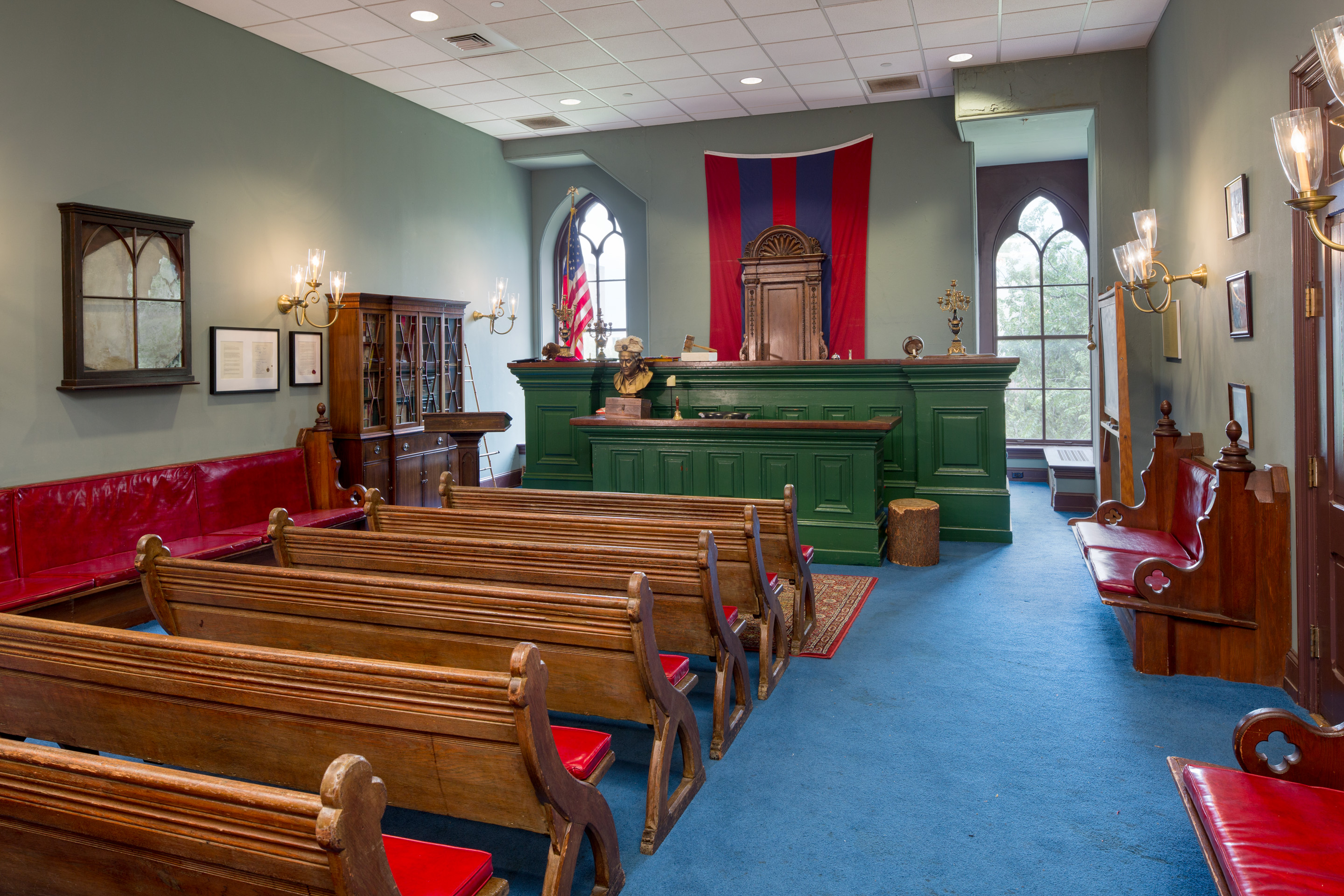
Philomathean meeting room

In addition to its eight general meetings, Philo has regular afternoon teas with professors and sponsors other academic events such as lecture series', film series, debates, book clubs, and other events. Most of these events center around inviting one or more Penn professors (and occasionally distinguished faculty from other universities) to the Halls to present their research and career experiences. Society members are given freedom to plan events fitting their personal and intellectual interests, which has led to events as varied as art exhibitions, chamber concerts, math olympiads, and the Poe Vespertil.

The Society has published several books, including, most recently, The Philomathean Society Anthology of Poetry in Honor of Daniel Hoffman — Hoffman, a former professor at the university and a distinguished poet in his own right, had brought many renowned poets and authors, including John Updike, Seamus Heaney, Joyce Carol Oates, and Yevgeny Yevtushenko, to read in the Philomathean Halls.

On February 16, 2010, Philo hosted a public screening of the 1971 internationally televised debate between philosophers Noam Chomsky and Michel Foucault. Philo's was the first public screening of the debate in the world since the original 1971 broadcast. Debate topics included human nature, justice, creativity and war. Since then, Philo has been the venue of many debates about matters central to modern society, such as a discussion of whether a tomato is a grape or a metaphor for Homeric authorship.

On March 28, 2019, Philo hosted a talk by US Poet Laureate Tracy K. Smith.

== Membership ==
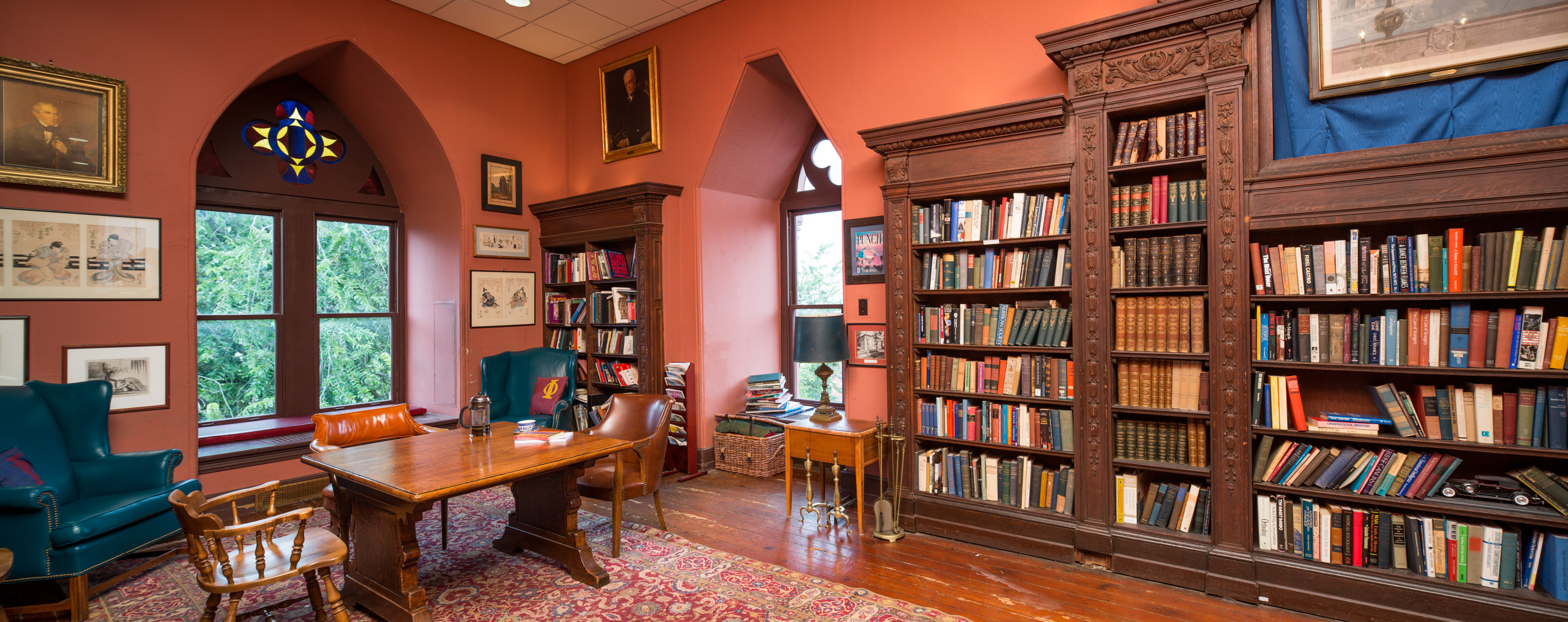
Known to some members as the William Henry Harrison Presidential Library, all members are given access to the Philomathean Library.

Membership in the Society is by application; all currently enrolled undergraduate and graduate students at the University of Pennsylvania are eligible for membership except in their final semester of study. Applications consist of three parts: an interview with four to five members of the Society, a presentation on a topic of the applicant's choice to a General Meeting of the Society, and a submission of creative or critical value. Members are elected once each academic semester by the Society at large.

The society is governed by a Cabinet of ten officers: the Moderator, First Censor, Second Censor, Scriba, Recorder, Treasurer, Librarian, Archivist, Annual Oration Director, and Art Gallery Director. The first four, often termed "the Bench" about their position during meetings, are attired in full academic gown at all society meetings, held eight times per semester on the top floor of College Hall, on Friday evenings. The position of Annual Oration Director was added in the early 2010s to provide additional support for the increased role of the Annual Oration, and the position of Art Gallery Director was added in 2019.

== Annual orations ==
Every year, Philo presents a public annual oration to the University, given by a prominent figure in the arts and sciences. Recent orations have included the following:

- In Spring 2025, Philo hosted the philosopher Slavoj Žižek, who spoke on an age of open obscenity in political life.
- On Feb 25th, 2025, Philo hosted Harold Finigan, Historian at the Darby (PA) Friends Meeting, who spoke of the Meetings involvement in the UGRR & highlighted the particular case of Allen Ricketts who self emancipated, found safe harbor in Darby, only to be later kidnapped and then rescued by the Darby Friends.
- In Spring 2024, Philo hosted Lech Wałęsa, the Nobel Laureate and former president of Poland, who discussed the current state of politics across Eastern Europe and argued that the West should continue military support to Ukraine.
- In Spring 2023, Philo hosted American philosopher and activist Cornel West, who talked about modern spiritual decay and the need for humanism and empathy in civic engagement.
- In Spring 2022, Philo hosted Gavin Schmidt, director of NASA's Goddard Institute for Space Studies, who talked about humanity's role in climate change and its implications.
- In Spring 2019, Philo hosted Tracy K. Smith, the 22nd Poet Laureate of the United States, who talked about the role of poetry in the contemporary world.
- In the fall of 2018, Philo hosted Michael Gazzaniga, who talked about his pioneering work in cognitive neuroscience and his proposal of the "Consciousness Instinct".
- In the fall of 2016, Philo hosted Jane Goodall, who talked about her career as a primatologist and her current mission of ecological conservation.
- In Spring 2016, Philo hosted John Mearsheimer, who talked about failures of American foreign policy in the Middle East.
- In 2015, Philo hosted Sylvia Nasar, who talked in Houston Hall about the revival of Marxism.
- In 2014, Philo hosted Julian Treasure.
- On 14 March 2013, Philo hosted Richard Dawkins, an evolutionary biologist and atheist. A video of the Annual Oration can be found here
- On 6 April 2011, Philo hosted noted environmental historian Jared Diamond. Diamond presented to more than 1,000 members of the University and local community on the role of water in the collapse or survival of societies, building on his influential book, Collapse.
- On 3 March 2010, Philo hosted feminism, gender, and sexuality theorist Judith Butler. Butler presented for approximately two hours on "Performativity and Precarity" to more than 400 University of Pennsylvania students and faculty.
- On 23 April 2009, Philo hosted American literary theorist, legal scholar, and New York Times columnist Stanley Fish. Drawing from his then-unpublished book Save The World On Your Own Time, Fish argued that professors' relationships with students should be strictly academic.
- On 16 April 2008, Philo hosted philosopher Daniel Dennett, who spoke on the role of cultural evolution.
- On 6 April 2005, Philo hosted former United States intelligence agent and counterterrorism specialist Malcolm Wrightson Nance.
- On 7 April 2004, Philo hosted playwright Arthur Miller. Miller delivered scenes from his satirical work Resurrection Blues to more than 800 Penn students, faculty, and staff at Penn's Zellerbach Theater.
- On 11 February 2003, Philo hosted novelist and essayist Salman Rushdie. Rushdie discussed many of his literary works, political views, and personal anecdotes in Penn's Irvine Auditorium.
- On 10 April 2002, Philo hosted journalist Joe Klein, author of Primary Colors, the once-anonymously-authored investigation into the 1992 Democratic Party Presidential Primary. Klein discussed Bill Clinton's presidency and contemporary American politics.
- On 1 May 2001, Philo hosted physicist Brian Greene. Green explained general relativity, quantum mechanics, and super-string theory to approximately 400 Penn students, faculty, and staff in Penn's Houston Hall.
- On 14 April 1994, Philo hosted author, social critic, and feminist Camille Paglia. Paglia discussed free speech and criticized the academic establishment in front of approximately 500 attendees.
- On 22 February 1993, Philo hosted Jean-Bertrand Aristide, President of Haiti.
- On 17 April 1990, Philo hosted author Joyce Carol Oates. Oates read one of her own short stories, Family, and discussed its unconventional structure.
- On 1 October 1988, Philo hosted Pulitzer-prize-winning author William Styron. Styron debunked romanticized notions of war and read a selection from his upcoming semi-autobiographical novel on World War II.

== Notable members ==
Philomatheans have included at least seven United States Representatives, three United States Senators, two ambassadors, and the founder of the Philadelphia Museum of Art, The Daily Pennsylvanian, Mask and Wig and the Pennsylvania Punch Bowl. Prominent Philomatheans have included:

- Thomas M. Pettit, 1813, Director of the U.S. Mint
- Henry Dilworth Gilpin, 1819, U.S. Attorney General
- Robert James Walker, 1819, U.S. Senator from Missouri, U.S. Secretary of the Treasury, Governor of Kansas and debating nemesis of Henry Clay
- Matthew H. Webster, 1820, Adjutant General of New York
- John Cadwalader, 1821, U.S. Representative from Pennsylvania 1855 to 1857, U.S. Judge for the Eastern District of Pennsylvania 1858–1879
- George Sharswood, 1828, founder, University of Pennsylvania School of Law and Chief Justice of Pennsylvania
- George Augustus Bicknell Jr., 1831, US Representative from Indiana 1877–1881
- Lyman Sanford, 1831, Adjutant General of New York, judge of Schoharie County, New York
- Henry Morton, 1859, 162nd Moderator, member of the committee to translate the Rosetta Stone, and founding president of the Stevens Institute of Technology 1870–1902
- Persifor Frazer, 1862, professor of chemistry and pioneering chemist, geologist, and naturalist
- William Pepper, 1862, University Provost 1881–1894
- Charles Custis Harrison, 1862, 176th Moderator, University Provost 1894–1910
- Robert Adams Jr., 1869, 196th Moderator, Pennsylvania State Senator 1883–1886, U.S. Minister to Brazil 1889–1890, U.S. Representative from Pennsylvania 1893
- Henry Galbraith Ward, 1870, 199th Moderator, Judge of U.S. Court of Appeals for the Second Circuit 1907–1933
- W. Atlee Burpee, 1878, founder of Burpee Seeds
- Eli Kirk Price, 1881, founder, Philadelphia Museum of Art
- George Wharton Pepper, 1887, U.S. Senator from Pennsylvania, author and chronicler of the Senate
- Ellis Robins, 1904, businessman and public servant based in Rhodesia, ennobled as Baron Robins in 1958
- Guo Taiqi, 1911, Foreign Minister of China in 1941, first Representative of China to the United Nations in 1946
- Randolph Greenfield Adams, 1914, librarian and historian
- Frank C. Baxter, 1928, TV personality, educator, and professor.
- Alfred Bester, 1934, recipient of the first Hugo Award for a science fiction Novel: The Demolished Man (1953), Science Fiction Grand Master (1988), and author of The Stars My Destination (1956)
- Bertram Korn, 1939, historian and senior rabbi at Reform Congregation Keneseth Israel.
- Carl Kaysen, 1940, director of the Institute for Advanced Study, MIT professor, and university trustee emeritus
- Hilary Putnam, 1948, philosopher, Walter Beverly Pearson Professor of Modern Mathematics and Mathematical Logic at Harvard University, and past president of the American Philosophical Association
- Arlen Specter, 1951, U.S. Senator from Pennsylvania
- Richard Wurtman, 1953, professor of neuroscience at MIT.
- Albert Fishlow, 1956, 406th Moderator, Professor of Economics at the University of California, Berkeley and former director of the Columbia Institute of Latin American Studies and Center for the Study of Brazil at Columbia, and former Senior Fellow for International Economics at the Council of Foreign Relations.
- Gary Goldschneider, 1959, pianist, composer, and writer.
- Victor Bockris, 1971, author, biographer, Andy Warhol associate.
- Mark Hosenball, 1974, investigative reporter at Reuters.
- Michael Bamberger, 1982, Sports Illustrated senior writer.
- Simon Glinsky, 1984, Co-Founder of Match.com.
- Robert Gant, 1990, Queer as Folk actor.
- Robert Ritchie, Episcopal priest and author
- Caren Lissner, 1994, novelist, columnist, and Editor-in-Chief of the Hudson Reporter.
- Vivek Tiwary, 1995, New York Times bestselling author and Broadway theater producer.
- Royden Yerkes, 1903, Episcopal priest, professor, and author

== Other Philomathean Societies ==
Several other societies share the Philomathean name. Among them are:

- Union College's Philomathean Society was founded in 1793 as the Calliopean while Union was still known as the Schenectady Academy. The name was changed to the Philomathean Society in 1795.
- Phi Mu, the second oldest secret organization for women, was founded as "The Philomathean Society" in 1852 at Wesleyan College in Macon, Georgia.
- New York University's Philomathean Society was founded in 1832.
- Phillips Academy's Philomathean Society, founded in 1825, is the second oldest high school debate society in the nation.
- The Philomates Association is the largest international academic association, with 23,000 members. It meets every year in Italy.
- Catawba College of Salisbury, North Carolina, also charters a Philomathean Society. The group was created in 1851, after the founding of the college, and served as a society for debate and fellowship for young men. Soon after its inception, the Philomathean Society began a library in their home because the college did not yet have one. In the early 1900s the society became inactive, but was resurrected in 1991 to serve in a different capacity. The all-male society now serves as a group dedicated to "Scholarship, Culture, Character, and Service", the motto of the College. Membership is by invitation only.
- The Philomathean Literary Society was established in 1842 at Erskine College. A number of South Carolinian politicians, theologians, lawyers, writers, and thinkers were inducted as members or honored with membership. It is one of Erskine's four literary societies today.
- Founded in 1849, the University of Virginia's Philomathean Society formed as a splinter group from the Washington Literary Society and Debating Union.
- Willamette University in Salem, Oregon, boasts the oldest Philomathean Society in the west; it was founded in 1856.
- Ouachita College, now Ouachita Baptist University, had a Philomathean Literary Society that existed from 1888 to 1931. The Philos and their rivals, the Hermesians, were the result in a split in the college's original literary society, the Adelphian Circle, formed in 1886.

== See also ==
- List of college literary societies
