= Union-Philanthropic Society =

American college literary group

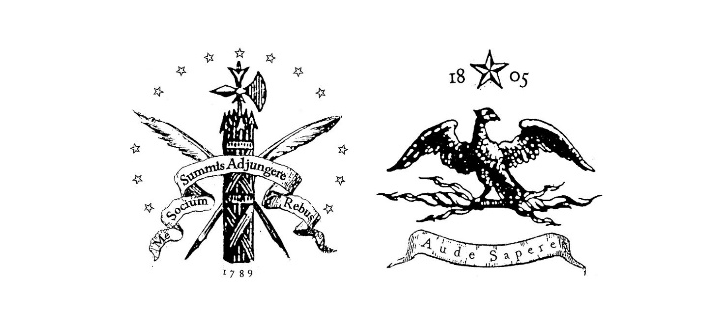
- Union-Philanthropic Society Heraldry
- Founded: September 22, 1789; 236 years ago Hampden–Sydney College
- Type: Literary
- Affiliation: Independent
- Status: Active
- Emphasis: Debate
- Scope: Local
- Chapters: 1
- Nickname: UPLS
- Former name: Union Philosophical Society; Philanthropic Literary Society
- Headquarters: Hampden Sydney, Virginia; United States

Winston Hall

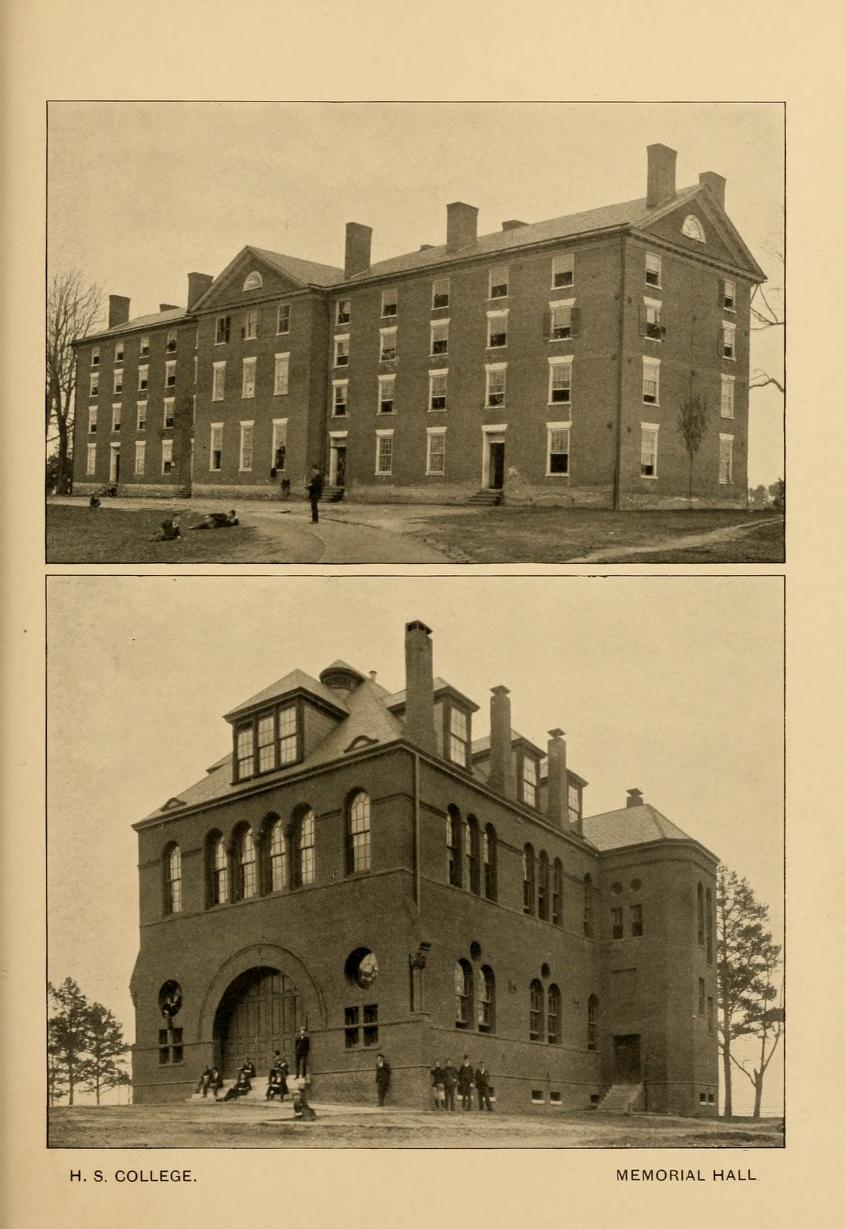
Cushing Hall and McIlwaine Hall

The Union-Philanthropic Society, also known as the Union-Philanthropic Literary Society, is a college literary and debating society at Hampden–Sydney College in Hampden Sydney, Virginia. Founded in 1789, it is the second oldest debating society still in operation in the United States and the oldest debating society in continuous operation.

== History ==
The Union Literary Society or Concordiæ Societas was established as a debating society at Hampden-Sydney College on September 22, 1789. A similar group, the Philanthropic Literary Society (Phips) or Fraternitas Philanthropica, was formed in March 1805 and reestablished in 1807. Until 1819, students were allowed to belong to both groups; this policy change and the relatively small study body at Hampden-Sydney made the Union and Philanthropic societies rivals.

By 1832, the rivalry between the two societies was "bitter". Each society had its hall which was lavishly decorated, in an effort to better the other. The societies also established extensive libraries of Greek and Latin authors, English classics, rare books, current fiction, and literary journals. The library of the Phips surpassed that of the college by 1835.

The two societies participated in inter-society debates and an annual intermediate oratory celebration, as well as holding debates amongst their members. For the single society debates, two members were chosen to represent each side, with the question being determined in advance. After a discussion, the members voted on the winning team. These debates frequently followed current politics in Virginia, such as the ethics of slavery in 1810, the value of temperance societies in 1828, the need for freedom of the press in 1830, the emancipation of slaves and the feasibility of colonizing Liberia in 1832, and the education of African Americans in 1835.

The two societies merged for their mutual survival to form the Union-Philanthropic Literary Society in September 1929 under the leadership of Graves Thompson (then president of the Philanthropic Society). Today, the two societies continue to exist as the Union-Philanthropic Literary Society.

Historically, the Union-Philanthropic Literary Society inhabited the top floor of Winston Hall in the Patrick Henry Room. Later, it met in both Cushing Hall and McIwaine Hall; the latter burned in a fire in 1957 while the society was still occupying its third floor. The society raised the funds to restore Hampden-Sydney's The Birthplace (circa 1756), which the society used as a museum and meeting place from 1961 until it outgrew the space in 1992. The society currently meets in its Hall at the Schaeffer House.

== Symbols and traditions ==
The Union Society's badge was light blue with a silver or white emblem. The emblem featured symbols relating to the organization's history—a fasces on top of two quills, with a scroll, and a semi-circle of stars. Its motto was "Me Socium Summis Adjungere Rebus" or "I Wish to Ally Myself With the Greatest Things".

The Philanthropic Society's badge was dark green with gold symbols, including an eagle with a star above and a scroll underneath, with the motto "Aude Sapere" or "Dare to Be Wise".

The Society owns several paintings of founding fathers and early trustees of Hampden-Sydney College along with rare texts originally owned by both the Union and Philanthropic Societies (currently housed in Bortz Library). Part of The Society's furnishings includes its thrones, reredos, and dais.

== Debates and Events ==
The Union-Philanthropic Literary Society continues to host weekly public debates at Schaeffer Hall. These weekly debates begin at 6pm on Sundays.

The society sponsors the Thomas Edward Crawley Tournament for high school debating teams. It also sponsors panel discussion and public debates, along with informal debates at its regular meetings.

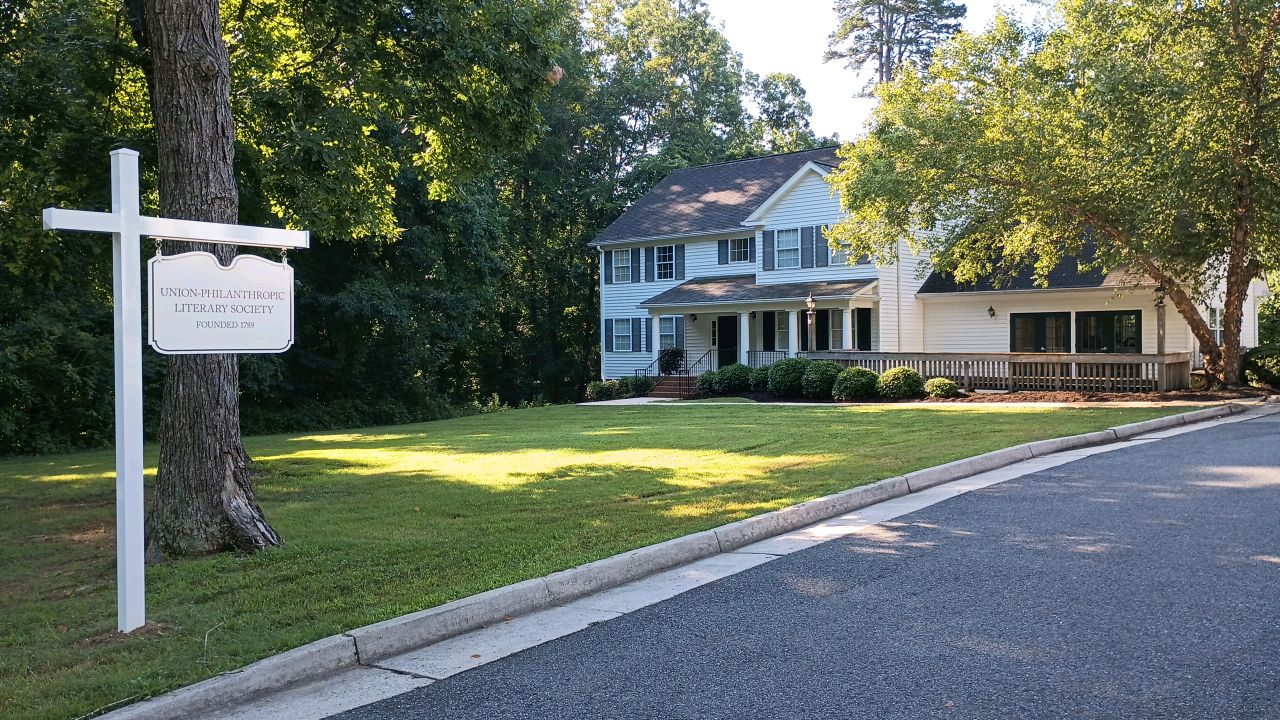
Schaeffer House

== Membership ==
The Society's main purpose is to advance the rhetoric skills of its members. The Union-Philanthropic Literary Society selects several students to summon for junior membership each term. It identifies prospective members through their participation in public meetings that are open to guests and students. Prospective junior members are selected based on the regularity and quality of their participation in public debates. Members do not need prior experience in debate or speech but should have an interest in learning and public discussion, as well as a friendly manner and a good character.

The society selects junior members whose rhetorical and speaking abilities are deemed exemplary to deliver a senior oration. Upon satisfactory completion of a ten-minute oration and questioning by senior and honorary members, the junior is made a senior member.

The society also awards honorary memberships to public figures and scholars who it finds to be exemplary.

== See also ==
- List of literary societies
