= Gamma Sigma =

International secondary school fraternity

- ΓΣ
- Founded: October 11, 1869; 156 years ago Brockport State Normal School
- Type: Literary/Social
- Affiliation: Independent
- Status: Active
- Emphasis: Secondary
- Scope: North America
- Motto: GNOTHI SOPHIAN "Seek Wisdom"
- Member badge
- Colors: Old rose and White
- Flower: Rose and carnation
- Publication: Pyramid & Crescent
- Chapters: 119+ inactive secondary 1 active alumni
- Nickname: "Gams"
- Headquarters: Canada
- Website: gammasigmafraternityinternational.com

Gamma Sigma Fraternity International (ΓΣ), was the first international secondary or high school fraternity. Initially founded as a literary society in 1869 at the Brockport State Normal School in Brockport, New York, it had chapters at normal school and high schools in the United States and Canada. The fraternity no longer has active chapters at the secondary school level; however, it has an active alumni association based in Canada.

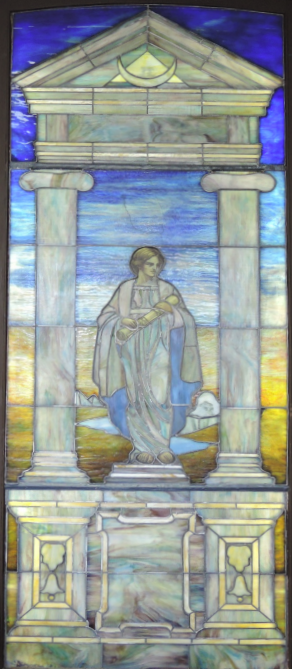
The Wisdom Window - A stained glass window dedicated to the Brockport Normal School Class of 1915 by the Alpha chapter.

== History ==
The Gamma Sigma Society was founded on October 11, 1869, at the Brockport State Normal School (known today as SUNY Brockport). The society was formed as a debating and literary society by eighteen chemistry students and professor Charles Donald McLean. McLean was the principal of the normal school and helped establish one of the major elements of the school's culture—its Greek letter societies. He was initiated as an honorary member of Gamma Sigma on November 6, 1869.

McLean helped the society secure rooms on campus and loaned the students $200 for furnishings. The students raised money to pay off the loan by charging admission to their literary events. Gamma Sigma Society was incorporated in New Your State on April 11, 1872.

The society formed chapters at other schools, both normal and high schools. (Note: "Normal" schools were developed as teachers training schools, appearing in the US by the 1850s through 1950s, and positioned as a practical option between technical/trade schools and more theoretical colleges and universities. Expansion of normal school degree offerings has led many of these to become junior colleges and then into state or regional universities, dropping the "Normal" moniker.) At a convocation held in Brockport in June 1891, the chapters of Gamma Sigma formed themselves into a general fraternity. The first chapter of Gamma Sigma Fraternity outside of New York State was chartered in Evanston, Illinois on November 24, 1894. It was the Eta chapter.

By 1925, Gamma Sigma Fraternity had 26 chapters in eight states and the District of Columbia. Alpha Zeta chapter in Niagara Falls, Ontario, installed on December 11, 1927 at Niagara Falls Collegiate Institute, making it the first international secondary school fraternity in the world. In June 1935, the fraternity had expanded to 49 chapters. By October 1958, the fraternity had grown to more than seventy chapters in the United States and Canada.

The organization no longer has active chapters at the secondary school level, with the last active chapter ending around 1994. However, it has an active alumni association based in the Niagara Region, Ontario, Canada. On October 11, 2019, Gamma Sigma Fraternity International alumni gathered in Niagara Falls, Ontario, Canada to celebrate the 150th anniversary of the organization.

== Symbols ==
The Gamma Sigma motto is GNOTHI SOPHIAN or "Seek Wisdom". The fraternity's Greek letters, Gamma Sigma, were chosen to represent the motto. Its colors are old rose and white. Its flowers are roses and carnations in the fraternity's colors. Its publication is the Pyramid & Crescent.

== Chapters ==
Gamma Sigma chartered at least 119 chapters at secondary schools and normal schools.

== Related organizations ==
In 1871, five members of the Gamma Sigma Society at the State Normal School in Brockport, New York transferred to the newly formed normal school in Geneseo, New York and founded the Delphic Society.

== Notable members ==
- Bill Danychuk (Beta Tau), player in the Canadian Football League
- Morley Kells (Beta Nu), Member of Provincial Parliament (Ontario)
- Nathan L. Miller (Delta), governor of New York and New York State Comptroller
- John M. Milne (Alpha), head of the institution that is today the State University of New York at Geneseo; founding member of the fraternity
- Alton B. Parker (Delta), Chief Judge of the New York Court of Appeals
- Frank E. Welles (Alpha), professor and chair of the Department of Classics with the Geneseo Normal School; founding member of the fraternity

== See also ==
- College literary societies
- High school fraternities and sororities
- List of college literary societies
