= Gamma Phi Society =

First literary society established at Colgate University

- ΓΦ
- Founded: Before 1833; 193 years ago Hamilton Literary & Theological Institution
- Type: Literary
- Former affiliation: Independent
- Status: Merged
- Merge date: 1840
- Successor: Adelphian Society
- Scope: Local
- Chapters: 1
- Headquarters: Hamilton, New York; United States

Gamma Phi Society was a college literary society founded prior to 1833 at the Hamilton Literary & Theological Institution (now Colgate University) in Hamilton, New York. Gamma Phi Society was the predecessor of the national Delphic Fraternity and the Beta Theta chapter of Beta Theta Pi at Colgate University.

== History ==
Gamma Phi Society was established sometime before 1833 at the Hamilton Literary & Theological Institution (now Colgate University) in Hamilton, New York as a literary society for students. Its actual founding date is unknown. Gamma Phi was one of the first student societies at the college and marked the start of Greek life on campus. It was joined by the Pi Delta literary society around 1834.

In 1840, the faculty intervened to dissolve Gamma Phi and Pi Delta due to the active competition for membership between the two literary societies. Gamma Phi's members merged into the Adelphian Society, a new campus literary society, in 1840.

Some members of the society transferred to the University of Rochester where they established the Delphic Society in 1850. William James Milne, a member of the Delphic Society, established a second Delphic Society at Geneseo Normal School (now State University of New York at Geneseo) in October 1871. The Geneseo society formed the statewide, and later national, Delphic Fraternity or Gamma Sigma Tau in 1871.

In 1880, the Adelphian Society became the Beta Theta chapter of the Beta Theta Pi fraternity.

== See also ==
- List of literary societies in the United States
- List of societies at Colgate University
