= Paul Higgins =

Paul Higgins may refer to:

- Paul Higgins (ice hockey) (born 1962), Canadian ice hockey right winger
- Paul Higgins (footballer) (1946–2016), Australian rules footballer
- Paul Higgins, alias of the perpetrator of the 1973 Canadian Imperial Bank of Commerce bank robbery
- Paul Higgins (actor) (born 1964), Scottish film and television actor
- R. Paul Higgins, physician and higher education officer from New York state
- Paul O'Higgins (1927–2008), Irish scholar of human rights and labour law
