= William J. Milne (educator) =

American educator, academic administrator, and author

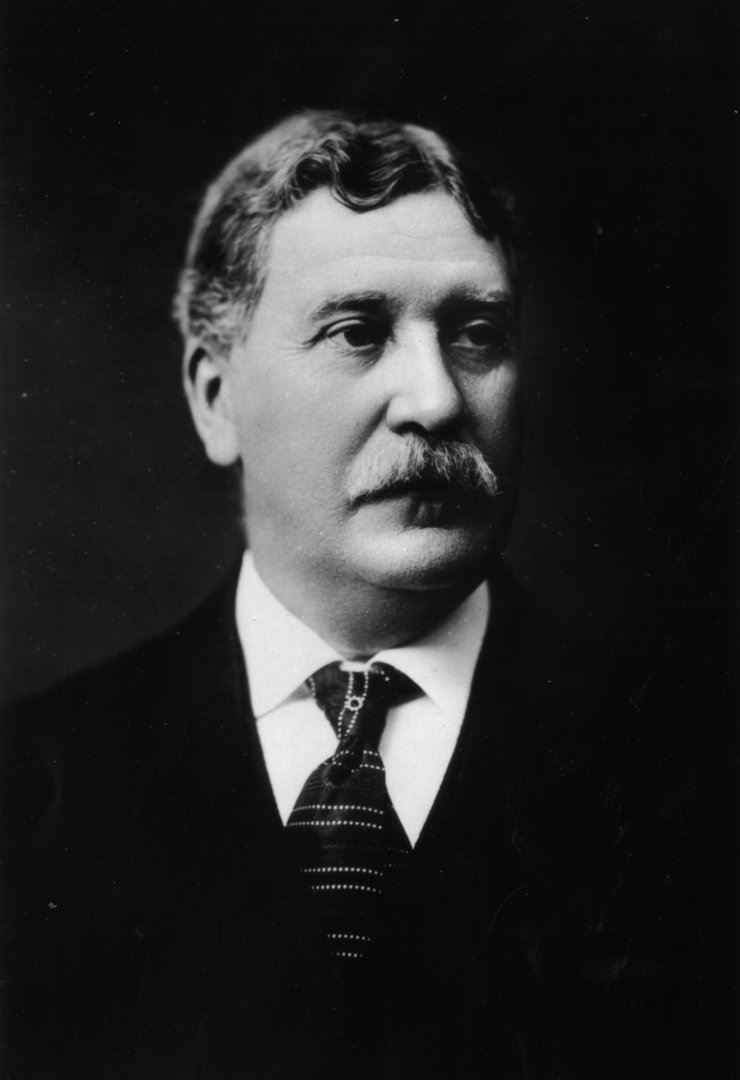
Photo of Dr. William James Milne

William James Milne (1843–1914) was an American educator, academic administrator, and author. He was known for heading two teachers' colleges in New York State, and writing numerous mathematics textbooks.

William J. Milne was born in Scotland in 1843. He was the eldest of six children of Charles and Jean Black Milne. His father brought the family from Scotland to Monroe county NY about 1852 where they resided for a short time then removing to Holley Orleans county NY. Milne worked his own way through school and college and was graduated at the University of Rochester in 1868. Milne was a member of the Delphic Society while a student at Rochester.

In 1871, Milne became principal of what had been planned four years before as Wadsworth Normal and Training School, and officially opened it in Geneseo, N.Y. as the Geneseo Normal and Training School. While at Geneseo, Milne was instrumental in the founding of the Delphic Society (which later became the Delphic Fraternity.) Milne was on the faculty of what is today the State University of New York at Brockport before his principalship at Geneseo.

He held his Ph.D. by October 1874, when he was ordained an elder of the town's Central Presbyterian Church. He also held an LL.D. degree in 1880, when, in March, that church and the First Presbyterian Church of Geneseo Village united to form the Presbyterian Church of Geneseo Village. He and the other elders of the two churches became the 12 elders of the united church, and in September he was elected as one of its 6 trustees, and also became one of three superintendents of its Sunday school. He continued as an elder and trustee at least into 1887. In 1889 Milne was succeeded as head of Geneseo Normal and Training School by his brother John M. Milne.

In 1889 Milne took the presidency of New York State Normal School at Albany, overseeing development of its mission, as reflected in its name changes to New York State Normal College in 1890, and to New York State College for Teachers in 1914. He died later that year on September 4 at Bethlehem, New Hampshire of a heart ailment. He was buried in Albany, NY.

The institution's early American practice-teaching school was named The Milne School after him, and after the school's closing in 1977, the building has continued, in its new roles, to be called Milne Hall. He was also memorialized—jointly with his brother John M. Milne, who had followed him as president at Geneseo—by the naming of the Milne Library, in 1966, as part of the institution that by then had the name State University College at Geneseo.

== Publications ==
Milne was the author of an extensive mathematics curriculum, with multiple editions, including the following texts and ancillary materials:

- The practical arithmetic on the inductive plan including oral and written exercises: Inductive Series (1878)
- Basic methods of teaching (1882)
- High school algebra: embracing a complete course for high schools and academies (c. 1892)
- Standard Arithmetic: embracing a complete course for schools and academies (c.1892 & 1895)
- Elements of arithmetic for primary and intermediate classes in public and private schools (c. 1893)

• Key to Milne's High School Algebra (1893)

- Elements of algebra: a course for grammar schools and beginners in public and private schools (c. 1894)
- A mental arithmetic (1897)
- Key to Milne's Plane and solid geometry (1899)

• Academic Algebra (1901) • Advanced Algebra (1901, 1902)

- High school algebra, embracing a complete course for high schools and academies (1906)
- Progressive Arithmetic - First Book - Authorized By the Minister of Education for Use in British Columbia (1912)

• Progressive Arithmetic - Third Book (1906)

- Standard algebra, revised (1914)
- Milne's New York State Arithmetic - Without Answers: First Book (1914 & 1918)
- Milne's New York State Arithmetic - Second Book (1914)

Revision of, for instance, his First course in algebra was continued after his death by Walter F. Downey, as the Milne-Downey ... texts.

- Milne's Inductive Series Elementary Arithmetic (1882)
