= John H. Fenimore V =

Adjutant General of New York from 1995 to 2001

- Fenimore as adjutant general in 1999
- Born: 1941 (age 84–85); Hartford, Connecticut, US
- Education: Union College; Air Command and Staff College; Industrial College of the Armed Forces
- Spouse: Barbara Ann Kircher (m. 1965)
- Children: 3
- Military career
- Service: United States Air Force
- Service years: 1963–2001
- Rank: Major General
- Nickname: "Jack"
- Unit: New York Air National Guard
- Commands: Adjutant General of New York; 106th Aerospace Recovery and Rescue Group; C-130 Aircraft, 139th Tactical Airlift Squadron; C-130E Aircraft, 29th Military Airlift Squadron
- Wars: Vietnam War
- Awards: Legion of Merit; Meritorious Service Medal; Air Medal; Air Force Commendation Medal; Complete list

John Hutchins Fenimore V (born 1941) is a retired United States Air Force officer. A veteran of the Vietnam War, he served from 1963 to 2001 and attained the rank of Major General. Fenimore served as Adjutant General of New York from 1995 to 2001, and his awards and decorations included the Legion of Merit, Meritorious Service Medal, Air Medal, and Air Force Commendation Medal.

== Early life and start of career ==
Fenimore as a high school senior in 1959

John H. Fenimore V was born in Hartford, Connecticut in 1941, the son of John H. Fenimore IV and Elizabeth (Pritchard) Fenimore. He was raised and educated in the Albany, New York area, including the Newtonville hamlet of Colonie, and is a 1959 graduate of the Milne School. Fenimore attended Union College in Schenectady, New York from 1959 to 1963 and graduated with a Bachelor of Science degree in economics. While in college, Fenimore participated in the Air Force Reserve Officer Training Corps. At graduation, he received his commission as a second lieutenant in the United States Air Force.

== Early career ==
From July 1963 to August 1964, Fenimore underwent pilot training at Moody Air Force Base, Georgia. From August 1964 to October 1965, he was assigned as a C-130B aircraft co-pilot with the 774th Troop Carrier Squadron at Langley Air Force Base, Virginia. Fenimore was promoted to first lieutenant in January 1965. He served as a C-130B co-pilot with the 774th Troop Carrier Squadron, based at Mactan Air Base, Philippines from October 1965 to October 1966, which included flights to and from the Republic of Vietnam during the Vietnam War.

Fenimore was assigned as a C-130E aircraft commander with 29th Military Airlift Squadron at McGuire Air Force Base, New Jersey from October 1966 to July 1968. He received promotion to captain in March 1968. From July 1968 to May 1970, Fenimore was assigned as a C-97 aircraft pilot with the 111th Military Airlift Group, based at Willow Grove Naval Air Station, Pennsylvania. He was assigned as a C-141 aircraft pilot with the 335th Military Airlift Squadron at McGuire Air Force Base from May 1970 to July 1971.

=== Flight information ===
Fenimore was rated as a Command Pilot. He logged more than 7,200 flight hours. His aircraft flown include the T-29, T-33, T-37, C-130 A/B/D/E/H, C-131, C-141, and 0-2A/B.

== Continued career ==
In July 1971, Fenimore joined the New York Air National Guard and was assigned as a C-130 commander with the 139th Tactical Airlift Squadron, where he served until April 1973. From April 1973 to September 1976, he was the air operations officer at the New York National Guard's state headquarters in Latham. In March 1973, he was promoted to major. From September 1976 to December 1981, he was assigned as safety officer for the 109th Tactical Airlift Group in Scotia. In October 1977, Fenimore was promoted to lieutenant colonel. Fenimore served as director of operations for the 105th Military Airlift Group at Stewart Air National Guard Base from December 1981 to May 1984. He was promoted to colonel in December 1982.

=== Military education ===
Fenimore is a 1972 graduate of the Squadron Officer School. In 1974, he completed the course at the Air Command and Staff College. He graduated from the Industrial College of the Armed Forces (now the Eisenhower School) in 1975.

== Later career ==
From May 1984 to August 1986, Fenimore served as air operations staff director and pilot at Stewart Air National Guard Base's New York Air National Guard headquarters. From August 1986 to May 1990, he commanded the 106th Aerospace Rescue and Recovery Group at Francis S. Gabreski Air National Guard Base. May 1990 to July 1995, he served as assistant adjutant general for air at the New York National Guard's State Area Command in Latham, and he was promoted to brigadier general in May 1991. In 1991, Fenimore was credited with recommending to Congressman Frank Horton that military transport aircraft like the C-130 be equipped with flares and chaff dispensers as a protective measure, a concept that was adopted by the U.S. Department of Defense. Fenimore was a resident of Cold Spring, New York when he was appointed to succeed Michael S. Hall as Adjutant General of New York in July 1995. He was promoted to major general in August 1996 and served as adjutant general until retiring in August 2001; he succeeded Michael S. Hall and was succeeded by Thomas P. Maguire.

Early in Fenimore's tenure, he led the response to a controversy involving the 174th Fighter Wing's first female F-16 fighter pilot. She alleged that instructors deliberately failed her during training due to sexism. Her wing commander countered that she failed because of performance deficiencies. The commander also alleged that she was involved in an improper relationship with her primary instructor. Fenimore concluded that the unit was guilty of sex discrimination. The wing commander was forced to retire and four other officers were reprimanded or transferred. The unit's "Boys from Syracuse" nickname was officially eliminated and the female pilot resumed training; she later served in the National Guard in Washington state and California. A re-investigation by New York's civilian inspector general criticized National Guard leaders including Fenimore, citing acceptance of statements from the female pilot and primary instructor about their relationship that the instructor later admitted were false.

In 2006, Fenimore authored a book, Surviving Terrorism: A Basic Family Guide.

== Awards ==
Fenimore's federal awards and decorations included:

- Legion of Merit
- Meritorious Service Medal
- Air Medal
- Air Force Commendation Medal
- Air Force Outstanding Unit Award with one oak leaf cluster
- Coast Guard Unit Commendation with one bronze award star
- Combat Readiness Medal
- National Defense Service Medal with one bronze service star
- Armed Forces Expeditionary Medal with one bronze service star
- Vietnam Service Medal
- Air Force Longevity Service Award with seven oak leaf clusters
- Armed Forces Reserve Medal with silver hourglass
- Small Arms Expert Marksmanship Ribbon
- Air Force Training Ribbon
- Vietnam Campaign Medal

Among Fenimore's state awards were:

- New York State Military Commendation Medal
- New York State Conspicuous Service Cross
- New York State Long and Faithful Service Award with 20 year device
- New York State Aid to Civil Authority
- New York State Exercise Support Ribbon
- Humane Service to New York State Medal
- New York State Military Support Medal - 1980 Olympics

== Dates of rank ==
Fenimore's dates of rank were:

- Major General, 2 August 1996
- Brigadier General, 15 May 1991
- Colonel, 30 December 1982
- Lieutenant Colonel, 13 October 1977
- Major, 1 September 1973
- Captain, 17 March 1967
- First Lieutenant, 10 January 1965
- Second Lieutenant, 10 July 1963
