= Milne School =

Defunct school in New York, United States

Information
- Established: 1845
- Closed: 1977

The Milne School, frequently referred to as Milne High School, was the campus laboratory school for what is now known as the University at Albany, State University of New York, located in Albany, New York. Its mission was to provide a location for prospective teachers to do their practice teaching. It may have been among the first practice-teaching schools in the United States, having opened in 1845.

== Overview ==
The Milne School was named for Dr. William J. Milne, a former president of the State Normal College, one of the earlier names for the University at Albany. By 1929, when The Milne School moved to a newly constructed building at 135 Western Avenue, it consisted of a junior and senior high school and served grades 7 through 12. Theodore Fossieck was the principal of the school from 1947 to 1972. In the 1960s, the school's admissions policies were challenged as being overly favorable to the relatives of Milne students and thus effectively excluding minorities and new residents; the state human rights commission agreed with the challenge. By the 1970s, SUNY was suffering budget shortfalls and also deemphasizing the teaching mission of the Albany branch. Fossieck decided to retire in 1972. Milne had five different principals during its last five years, and closed in 1977.

In the 1977 Bricks and Ivy yearbook, Charles Bowler referred to the Milne School as having "a high-powered faculty teaching beautiful student teachers, experimenting with methodology, still keeping their covenant by turning out educated students.

The building is now called "Milne Hall" and currently houses the University at Albany Rockefeller College of Public Affairs & Policy; the Department of Political Science; the Department of Public Administration and Policy; and the Center for Policy Studies.

== Notable alumni ==
- David Standish Ball, Episcopal bishop of Albany (1984-1998)
- Paul G. Bulger, president of Buffalo State College (1959-1967)
- Peggy Bulger, folklorist
- John H. Fenimore V, Adjutant General of New York
- Winifred Goldring, paleontologist
- Robert S. Langer, biomedical engineering professor at MIT
- Tara VanDerveer, basketball coach (left Milne after ninth grade)
