= Adelphian Society =

American collegiate literary society (1840–1880)

- Founded: July 24, 1840; 185 years ago Hamilton Literary and Theological Institution
- Type: Literary
- Affiliation: Independent
- Status: Merged
- Merge date: December 10, 1880
- Successor: Beta Theta chapter of Beta Theta Pi
- Scope: Local
- Motto: "No Nikomen"
- Chapters: 1
- Members: 500+ lifetime
- Headquarters: Hamilton, New York; United States

The Adelphian Society was a college literary society established in 1840 at the Hamilton Literary and Theological Institution (now Colgate University) in Hamilton, New York. It merged into Beta Theta Pi fraternity in 1880.

== History ==
The Aldelphian Society was organized on July 24, 1840 at the Hamilton Literary and Theological Institution (later called Hamilton College, Madison University, and now Colgate University). The Aldelphian Society had 31 founding members. Its first president was Orrin Bishop Judd.

The Adelphian Society was founded on the same day as the Aeonian Society, its sister society. The two literary societies were built on the remains of the college's first literary societies, Gamma Phi Society, which included juniors and seniors, and Pi Delta, a society for freshmen and sophomores. Competition for members between the two societies led to faculty intervention, with the result that both seem to have been dissolved in 1840 when the Adelphian and Aeonian Societies came into existence.

The purpose of the Aldelphian Society was to “progress in literary attainments and cultivation among all the members of an undecaying friendship." Its main activity was the presentation of original works by students. This activity resulted in faculty approval as the group "stimulated the development of oral and written expression, which were phases of the curriculum badly in need of expansion.” The society held semi-annual public meetings that included prayer, oration, music, and a reading of the oracle. The Aldelphian and Aeonian both held anniversary celebrations annually during the university's commencement.

In 1871, the society had 44 active members and 495 lifetime initiates. On December 10, 1880, the Adelphian Society became the Beta Theta chapter of the national Beta Theta Pi fraternity.

The Aldelphian Society's records are held at the Special Collections and University Archives of Colgate University Libraries.

== Symbols ==
The society's motto was "No Nikomen".

== Related organizations ==
In 1850, five members of the Adelphian Society transferred to the newly formed University of Rochester and founded the Delphic Society.

== Notable members ==
- Thomas W. Osborne, United States Senator

== See also ==
- Literary society
- College literary societies
- List of societies at Colgate University
- List of college literary societies
