= Harold G. Strait =

Prominent resident of Mansfield, Pennsylvania

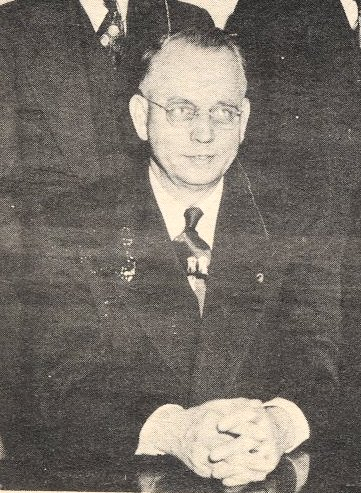
Archive photo of Harold G. Strait of Mansfield, PA.

Harold G. Strait (born Aug. 12, 1898, died Dec. 15, 1983) was a prominent resident of Mansfield, Pennsylvania. He was the son of George and Anna Strait.

Harold Strait was the president of the Appalachian Thruway Association of Tioga County, Pennsylvania. On June 26, 1987 the Pennsylvania Department of Transportation dedicated the Harold G. Strait Memorial Highway in honor of the long-time Mansfield resident who worked hard for better highways.

Harold Strait was a World War I veteran who served in the U.S. Army. He graduated from the Mansfield Normal School, today Mansfield University.

While studying at Mansfield, Strait became a dedicated member of the Delphic Fraternity. He was one of the last initiated members of 1915 and helped schedule fraternity reunions until the 1960s.

Strait was a member of the First Baptist Church and the Tioga County Historical Society. Strait held the position of Chief Clerk of Tioga County from 1941 through 1946. He was a member of many civic organizations in Mansfield, including the American Legion and the Kiwanis Club. He was also an active member of Freemasonry, achieving the title of 33rd degree Mason.

Harold Strait operated Strait's Hardware in Mansfield, a family business from 1891 to 1971, until he retired. Strait was honored with a 50-year certificate from the Mansfield Chamber of Commerce.

Strait was married to Helen Stepler, a native of Chambersburg. They had no children. Upon his death Strait was married to Marguerite C. Strait.
