= 18th Airlift Squadron =

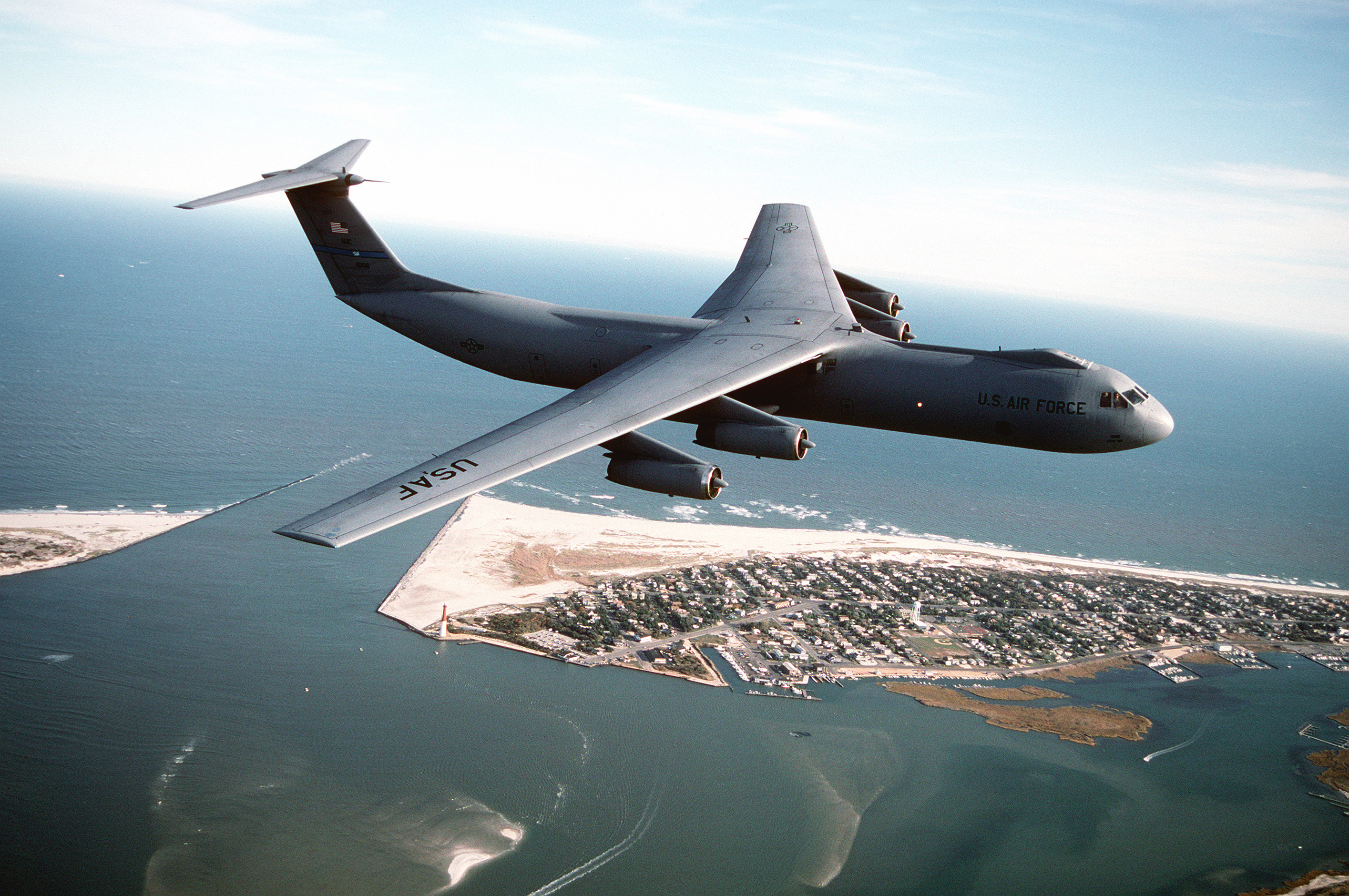
- A C-141 Starlifter of the 438th Airlift Wing flying over the northern New Jersey coastline near McGuire AFB (Note: Aircraft is Lockheed C-141B, serial 64-0616.)
- Active: 1942–1943; 1954-1966; 1968-1995
- Country: United States
- Branch: United States Air Force
- Role: Airlift
- Decorations: Air Force Outstanding Unit Award; Vietnamese Gallantry Cross with Palm

Insignia
- 18th Airlift Squadron emblem

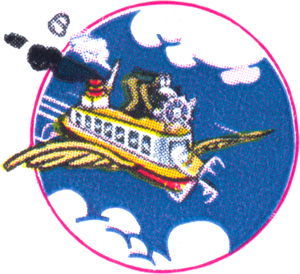
- 18th Ferrying Squadron emblem

The 18th Airlift Squadron is an inactive United States Air Force unit. Its last assignment was to the 305th Operations Group, Air Mobility Command, stationed at McGuire Air Force Base, New Jersey, where it was inactivated on 1 July 1995.

== History ==
=== World War II ===
From activation in April until July 1942 the 18th ferried aircraft from the United States to the South Pacific and Southwest Pacific theaters of operations. Most flights originated from McClellan Field and proceeded via the Hawaiian Islands, Christmas Island, Canton Island, Fiji Islands, and New Caledonia, to Australia. From July 1942 until disbandment in October 1943, the 18th serviced outbound aircraft, briefed crews of these aircraft and controlled flights until they reached Hawaii.

=== Cold War ===
Reactivated on 18 July 1954, at McGuire Air Force Base, New Jersey, the squadron came under the Military Air Transport Service (MATS). It became operational in September, transporting passengers, cargo and mail in Douglas C-118 Liftmasters to South America, Europe, Africa, Asia and Australia, as well as within the US. It participated in operations, exercises, and maneuvers of the US armed services and transported important US and foreign officials. It also provided airlift support for the United Nations.

In December 1956 and January 1957 the unit airlifted over 9,700 Hungarian refugees from Rhein Main Air Base, West Germany to the United States. In 1961 the 18th began flying Boeing C-135 Stratolifters. The first major deployment with these new aircraft was to the Arctic with 2,300 Army personnel for cold weather training. In 1963, it participated in the airlift of UN forces and cargo to the Congo and airlifted personnel and cargo to New Zealand in support of Antarctic operations. It changed in 1965 from mostly European flights to airlift support of forces in South Vietnam. It then participated in an airlift to the Dominican Republic in March 1965 with US forces to preserve order. On 1 February 1966, shortly after being designated the 18th Military Airlift Squadron, all personnel were reassigned, and on 15 June 1966 the squadron inactivated.

The squadron became a C-141 unit when activated in July and organized in August 1968. On 15 August, it flew its first mission to Southeast Asia (SEA). Most regular scheduled flights until 1969 were to SEA in support of the Vietnam War. Typically, the trip from McGuire AFB and back took from five to seven days. Between March and June 1972, flights to SEA took a major share of C-141 missions. With the exception of these missions, the 18th MAS usually flew over the Atlantic to Greenland, Europe, the Middle East and Africa. Each year from activation in 1968 to 1974, the squadron resupplied scientific stations in the Antarctic involved in Operation Deep Freeze. For three or four months each year, between October and February, it flew to New Zealand from McGuire, and then shuttled from New Zealand to the Antarctic.

The 18th was frequently involved in the airlift for the US Army's airborne exercises and supported other US services and NATO forces. It provided airlift support for presidential and Vice-Presidential trips within the US and overseas. It supported NASA's Apollo program until 1971. The squadron frequently flew humanitarian missions for the relief of victims of earthquakes, hurricanes, floods and snowstorms; this included flights to Pakistan in 1970 and 1971; Managua, Nicaragua, in 1972 and 1973; Guatemala, Italy and Turkey in 1976; the Dominican Republic in 1978; and the Yemen Arab Republic in December 1982. It provided, on occasion, airlift for the US State Department and in April 1972 transported two musk oxen to China in exchange for two giant pandas. On 13 and 14 April of that year it airlifted supplies to Israel in support of that country's defense against its Arab neighbors. It also provided the airlift of UN Peace-Keeping forces to the Middle East after the ceasefire, between 19 November and 16 December 1973. The squadron participated, between April and June 1975, in the airlift of Vietnamese refugees from SEA to the United States. It airlifted French and Belgian troops to Zaire in May and June 1978 to protect and evacuate Europeans threatened by civil war. In July-October 1980, it helped airlift an F-4 wing to Egypt in support of first the joint USAF/Egyptian Air Force exercise. On 9–12 May 1983, the first all-woman C-141 crew, members of the 18th MAS, flew from McGuire to Rhein Main on an aeromedical evacuation mission.

It was inactivated in July 1995 as part of the retirement of the C-141 Starlifter.

=== Lineage ===
- Constituted as the 18th Ferrying Squadron on 18 February 1942

Activated on 27 April 1942
Redesignated the 18th Transport Squadron on 19 March 1943
Disbanded on 31 October 1943
Reconstituted and redesignated the 18th Air Transport Squadron, Medium on 22 March 1954
Activated on 18 July 1954
Redesignated the 18th Air Transport Squadron, Heavy on 1 January 1962
Redesignated the 18th Military Airlift Squadron on 8 January 1966
Discontinued and inactivated on 15 June 1966
Activated in 1968 (not organized)
Organized on 11 July 1968
Redesignated the 18th Airlift Squadron 1992
Inactivated 1 July 1995

=== Assignments ===
- Pacific Sector, Air Corps Ferrying Command, 27 April 1942
- 25th Wing, Army Air Forces Ferrying Command (later, South Pacific Wing, Air Transport Command), 23 June 1942
- 11th Ferrying Group, 28 Jul 1942 – 31 Oct 1943
- 1611th Air Transport Group, 18 July 1954
- 1611th Air Transport Wing, 18 January 1963
- 438th Military Airlift Wing, 8 Jan-8 Jun 1966
- Military Airlift Command, 11 July 1968
- 438th Military Airlift Wing, 1 August 1968
- 438th Military Airlift Group, 1 October 1978
- 438th Military Airlift Wing, 1 June 1980 – 30 September 1994
- 305th Operations Group, 1 October 1994 – 1 July 1995

=== Stations ===
- Hamilton Field, California, 27 April 1942 – 31 October 1943
- McGuire Air Force Base, New Jersey, 18 July 1954 – 8 June 1966
- McGuire Air Force Base, New Jersey, 1 August 1968 – 1 July 1995

=== Aircraft ===
- Unknown, 1942–1943 (ferried B-17s and B-26s to Jun 1942)
- C-118 Liftmaster, 1954–1961
- C-135 Stratolifter, 1961–1966
- C-141 Starlifter, 1968 – 1995.
