= 1611th Air Transport Wing =

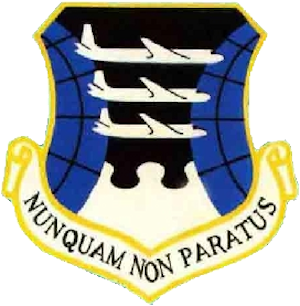
- Emblem of the 1611th Air Transport Wing
- Active: 1954–1965
- Disbanded: 8 January 1966
- Country: United States
- Allegiance: United States
- Branch: United States Air Force
- Type: Airlift
- Role: Military Air Transport Service
- Station: McGuire Air Force Base
- Motto(s): Nunquam non-Paratus; Never Not Ready

Commanders
- First Commander: Captain Charles F. Vickers
- Final Commander: Colonel Roland J. Barnick

Aircraft flown
- Transport: List of Transports: C-118 Liftmaster (Navy R6D); Douglas C-54 Skymaster; C-135A Stratolifter; C-130E Hercules

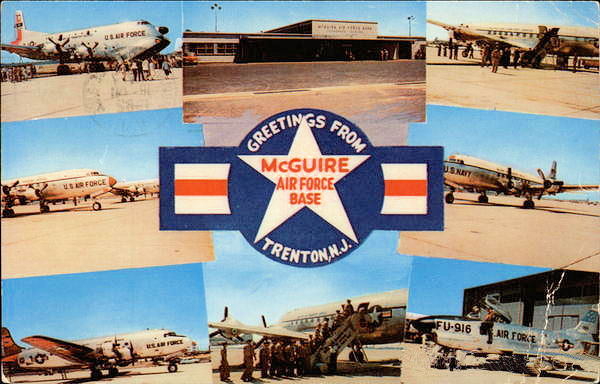
McGuire AFB – MATS Era Card – early 1960s

The 1611th Air Transport Wing is an inactive United States Air Force unit. Its last was assigned to the Eastern Transport Air Force, Military Air Transport Service, stationed at McGuire Air Force Base, New Jersey. It was inactivated on 8 January 1966.

With the disestablishment of MATS, the USAF assets of the Wing were reassigned to the 438th Military Airlift Wing, Military Airlift Command.

== History ==
Established in 1954 at McGuire AFB, New Jersey after Military Air Transport Service assumed jurisdiction at McGuire from Air Defense Command. The unit operated primarily C-118 Liftmaster (Navy R6D) transports throughout its existence; received C-135 Stratolifters in 1962 and was upgraded from a medium to a heavy transport wing. Commenced transitioning to C-130E Hercules late 1963. Supported Air Force Reserve associate units beginning in 1961. It operated Aerial Port and Port of Embarkation for the Northeast United States, primarily for European flights as well as maintained support for Air Weather Service and Air Rescue Service squadrons and aircraft as well as Air Defense Command interceptor aircraft and other air defense units. Discontinued on 8 January 1966 along with MATS, equipment and personnel were reassigned to MAC 438th MAW same date.

=== Lineage ===
- Established as 1611th Air Transport Wing (Medium) on 1 May 1954 and activated

Redesignated as: 1611th Air Transport Wing (Heavy) on 1 January 1962
Discontinued on 8 January 1966

=== Components ===
- 1611th Air Transport Group, 1 July 1954 – 18 January 1963
- 18th Air Transport Squadron, 18 July 1954 – 8 January 1966
- 38th Air Transport Squadron, 18 October 1954 – 25 June 1965
- 29th Air Transport Squadron, 13 April 1955 – 8 January 1966
- 30th Air Transport Squadron, 5 May 1955 – 25 January 1965
- 58th Air Transport Squadron, 30 June 1955 – 18 June 1960
- 99th Air Transport Squadron, 6–25 Jul 1955

Originated as: 99th Transport Squadron constituted c. 4 June 1943, activated 21 June 1943, disbanded 1 December 1943
Assigned to: 13th Ferry / Air Transport Squadron, India-China Wing, Air Transport Command.

- 100th Air Transport Squadron, 9–25 Oct 1955
- 44th Air Transport Squadron, 9 November 1955 – 14 November 1955
- 40th Air Transport Squadron, 8 January 1962 – 8 January 1966
- 1611th Air Traffic (Later: 1611th Air Terminal / 1611th Aerial Port) Squadron 1 July 1954 – 8 January 1966
- Aerial Port of Embarkation, McGuire AFB 1 April 1955 – 8 January 1966
  - 1611th Air Base Group
    - 1611th Air Base Squadron 1 July 1954 – 1 November 1955
    - 1611th Air Police Squadron 1 July 1954 – 1 November 1955
    - 1611th Food Services Squadron 1 July 1954 – 1 November 1955
    - 1611th Installations (Later: 1611th Civil Engineering) Squadron 1 July 1954 – 8 January 1966
    - 1611th Motor Vehicle (Later: 1611th Transportation) Squadron 1 July 1954 – 8 January 1966
    - 1611th Operations Squadron 1 August 1958 – 8 January 1966
    - 1611th Services Squadron 18 January 1963 – 8 January 1966
    - 1611th Supply Squadron 18 January 1963 – 8 January 1966
    - 1611th Maintenance Squadron 1 July 1954 – 1 August 1955 (R/D: 1611th FMS)
  - 1611th Maintenance Group 1 August 1955 – 18 January 1963
    - 1611th Field Maintenance Squadron 1 August 1955 – 8 January 1966
    - 1611th Periodic Maintenance Squadron 1 July 1954 – 1 July 1961
    - 1611th Flight Line (Later: 1611th Organizational) Maintenance Squadron 1 November 1956 – 25 June 1965
    - 1611th Communications & Electronics Maintenance Squadron 1 October 1959 – 8 January 1966
    - 1612th Organizational Maintenance Squadron 1 October 1963 – 8 January 1966
    - 1613th Organizational Maintenance Squadron 1 October 1963 – 8 January 1966
- ATTACHED UNITS

12th Aeromedical Transport Squadron, 8 November 1956 – 8 January 1966 (1st Aeromedical Transport Group)
Naval Air Transport Squadron Three (VR-3), 16 July 1957 – 8 January 1966 (Naval Air Transport Wing – Atlantic)

- Non Associated Air Force Reserve Units

514th Troop Carrier Wing, 15 March 1961 – 8 January 1966
903d Troop Carrier Group, 28 December 1962 – 8 January 1966

=== Stations ===
- McGuire Air Force Base, New Jersey, 1 May 1954 – 8 January 1966

=== Aircraft ===
- C-54 Skymaster, 1954
- C-118 Liftmaster (USAF), 1954–1966

R6D (Navy), 1954

- C-135A Stratolifter, 1962–1966
- C-130E Hercules, 1963 – ?
