= John Beach Abbott =

New York county judge and fraternity founder

John Beach Abbott (Photo courtesy of the Genesee Country Village and Museum.)

John Beach Abbott (December 31, 1854 - January 17, 1935) was the first president of the Livingston County Bar Association in Western, New York. He was a New York county judge, a State Democratic Leader, and one of the founding members of the Delphic Fraternity at the Geneseo State Normal School (today SUNY Geneseo.)

John B. Abbott, Esq., was born in Dansville, Livingston County, New York on December 31, 1854. He was the son of prominent attorney J. Beach Abbott. The younger Abbott attended the Geneseo State Normal School then the University of Rochester. Abbott completed his law studies and was admitted to the New York State Bar Association in 1880. He worked with his father at the Rochester law firm of Abbott & Abbott until the senior Abbott died in 1898.

In 1906 John Beach Abbott was named the first president of the Livingston County Bar Association and remained a member of the association until six month before his death in 1935.

Abbott was a member of the Geneseo Club where he was active in educational work, and for more than 20 years he was president of the Board of Education. He was also a long-time member of the Board of Visitors of the Geneseo State Normal School.

Abbott served as Geneseo's postmaster from 1888 to 1890, and was appointed a Livingston County court judge in 1914. At one time he was president of the Livingston County Democratic Committee, and was a Presidential Elector in 1932.

Abbott was married and had no children. He lost his wife four years prior to his death. After two years of ill health, he died at the age of 80 at his home in Geneseo on Thursday, January 17, 1935.

== Sources ==
- Livingston County Leader, Geneseo, NY - Vol 50, Num 25, Friday, January 25, 1935.
- Eagles Byte Home Page
- The Democratic Party of the State of New York: Archive.org
- The Delphic Fraternity History e-Book, 1847-2017.
- Rochester Alumni Review, 1935.
