= 29th Military Airlift Squadron =

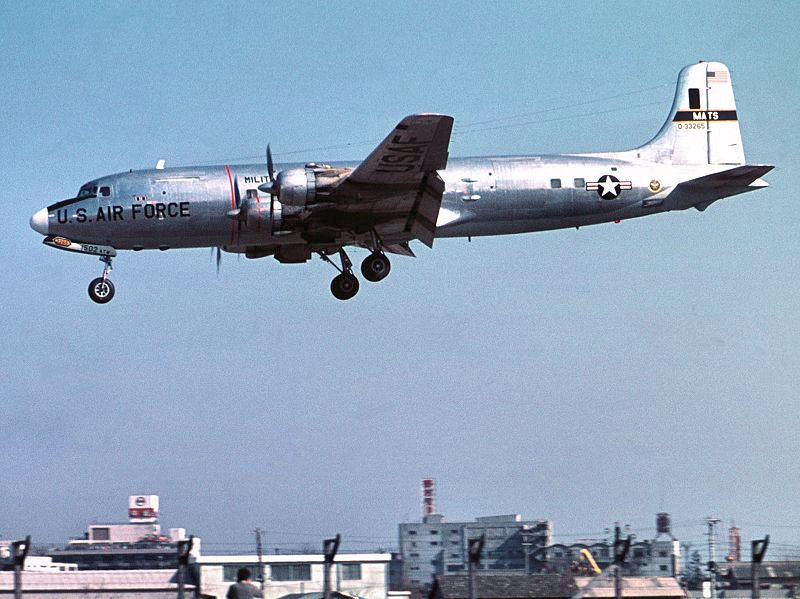
- C-118 Liftmaster as flown by the squadron
- Active: 1942–1943; 1952–1968
- Country: United States
- Branch: United States Air Force
- Role: Airlift
- Motto: Always Best

Insignia
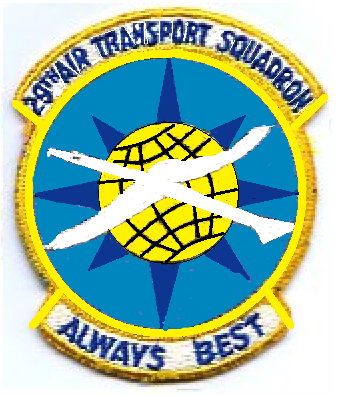
- 29th Military Airlift Squadron emblem

The 29th Military Airlift Squadron is an inactive United States Air Force unit. It was last assigned to the 438th Military Airlift Wing at McGuire Air Force Base, New Jersey, where it was inactivated on 31 August 1968.

The squadron was first activated in 1942 as the 29th Ferrying Squadron. It served on the North Atlantic ferrying route until 1943, when it was disbanded as Air Transport Command reorganized into a station system. The squadron was reconstituted in 1952 as the 29th Air Transport Squadron and served as a heavy airlift unit until inactivating.

== History ==
=== World War II ===
The squadron was first activated in July 1942 at Presque Isle Army Air Field, Maine as the 29th Ferrying Squadron. It was assigned to the 8th Ferrying Group, and its primary mission was ferrying aircraft and transporting cargo on the North Atlantic ferrying route. A little over a week after activation, the squadron moved to Goose Bay Airport, Newfoundland. In March 1943, it was designated the 29th Transport Squadron along with other Air Transport Command (ATC) units that were not involved in ferrying aircraft from factories to operational units.

The group/squadron organization did not fit well with the ATC mission. The squadrons of the 8th Transport Group were spread over bases in the United States, Newfoundland, Greenland and Iceland. (Note: The group's 30th Transport Squadron was at Narsaarsuk and its 31st Transport Squadron was at Reykjavík.) In September 1943, ATC reorganized its foreign stations. The 29th was disbanded and replaced at Goose by Station 4 of the North Atlantic Wing, Air Transport Command.

=== Cold War ===
In July 1952, Military Air Transport Service (MATS) replaced its Major Command controlled operational squadrons with units that had served with ATC during World War II. The squadron was reconstituted as the 29th Air Transport Squadron and activated at Westover Air Force Base, Massachusetts, where it was assigned to the 1600th Air Transport Group and absorbed the personnel and Boeing C-97 Stratofreighters of the 1253rd Air Transport Squadron, which was discontinued. In April 1955, Strategic Air Command took control of Westover from MATS.

The squadron moved to McGuire Air Force Base, New Jersey, where it was assigned to the 1611th Air Transport Group. In January 1962, MATS adopted the dual deputy organization. The 1611th Group was discontinued and the squadron was assigned directly to the 1611th Air Transport Wing. When Military Airlift Command (MAC) replaced MATS in January 1966, the squadron became part of MAC's 438th Military Airlift Wing. The squadron ended operations on 12 August 1968 and was discontinued at the end of the month.

== Lineage ==
- Constituted as the 29th Ferrying Squadron on 9 July 1942

Activated on 25 July 1942
Redesignated 29th Transport Squadron on 24 March 1943
Disbanded on 1 September 1943
Reconstituted as the 29th Air Transport Squadron, Heavy on 20 June 1952
Activated on 20 July 1952
Redesignated 29th Air Transport Squadron, Medium on 11 September 1953
Redesignated 29th Military Airlift Squadron on 8 January 1966
Discontinued and inactivated on 31 August 1968

=== Assignments ===
- 8th Ferrying Group (later 8th Transport Group), 25 July 1942-1 September 1943
- 1600th Air Transport Group, 20 July 1952
- 1611th Air Transport Group, 13 April 1955
- 1611th Air Transport Wing, 18 January 1963
- 438th Military Airlift Wing, 8 January 1966-31 August 1968

=== Stations ===
- Presque Isle Army Air Field, Maine, 25 July 1942
- Goose Bay Airport, Newfoundland, 6 August 1942–1 September 1943
- Westover Air Force Base, Massachusetts, 20 July 1952
- McGuire Air Force Base, New Jersey, 13 April 1955–31 August 1968

=== Aircraft ===
- Boeing C-97 Stratofreighter, 1952–1953
- Douglas C-54 Skymaster, 1953–1954
- Douglas C-118 Liftmaster, 1954–1964
- Lockheed C-130 Hercules, 1964–1968
