= 38th Air Transport Squadron =

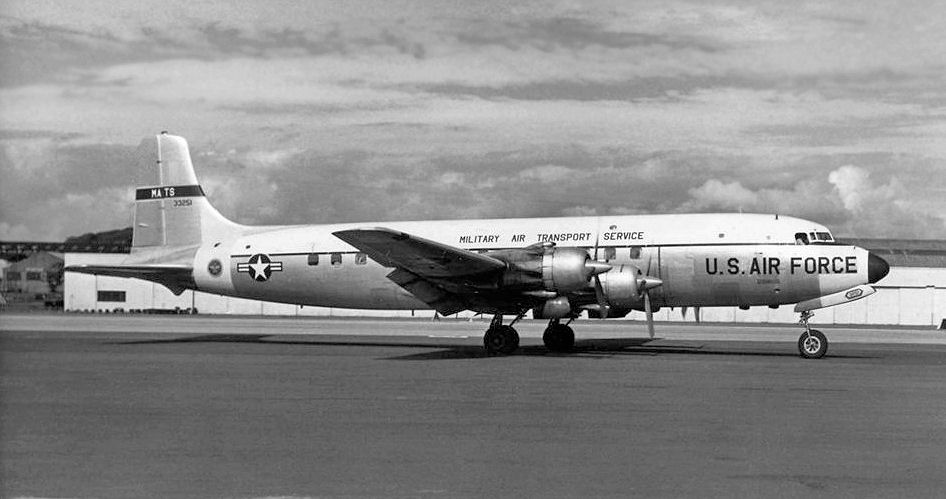
- Douglas C-118 as flown by the squadron
- Active: 1942-1943; 1954-1965
- Country: United States
- Branch: United States Air Force
- Role: Airlift

Insignia
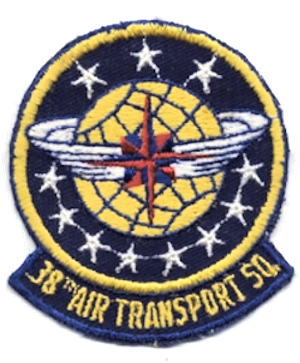
- Patch with 38th Air Transport Squadron emblem

The 38th Air Transport Squadron is an inactive United States Air Force unit. Its last was assigned to the 1611th Air Transport Wing, Military Air Transport Service, stationed at McGuire Air Force Base, New Jersey. It was inactivated on 25 June 1965.

== History ==
Activated during World War II as a ferrying squadron. Moved to the Pacific and served on Christmas Island until it was replaced by Station 8, Pacific Wing, Air Transport Command in a general reorganization of Air Transport Command in 1943.

Reestablished in 1954 as a Douglas C-118 Liftmaster transport squadron. Flew MATS passenger flights on a worldwide scale until inactivated in 1965 with the phaseout of the C-118.

== Lineage ==
- Constituted as the 38th Ferrying Squadron

Activated c. 9 July 1942

- Redesignated 38th Transport Squadron on 19 March 1943

Disbanded on 18 October 1943

- Reconstituted as the 38th Air Transport Squadron, Medium c. 1 June 1954

Activated on 18 October 1954
Inactivated and discontinued on 25 June 1965

=== Assignments ===
- 11th Ferrying Group, c. 9 July 1942
- 19th Ferrying Group (later 19th Transport Group) 1 November 1942 – 18 October 1943
- 1611th Air Transport Group, 18 October 1954
- 1611th Air Transport Wing, 1 January 1963 - 25 June 1965

=== Stations ===
- Hamilton Field, California, c. 9 July 1942
- Cassidy Field, Christmas Island, 1 January 1943 – 18 October 1943
- McGuire Air Force Base, New Jersey, 18 October 1954 - 25 June 1965

=== Aircraft ===
- Douglas C-118 Liftmaster, 1954-1965
