= Louis Jay Heath =

Journalist and descendant of U.S.Founding Fathers

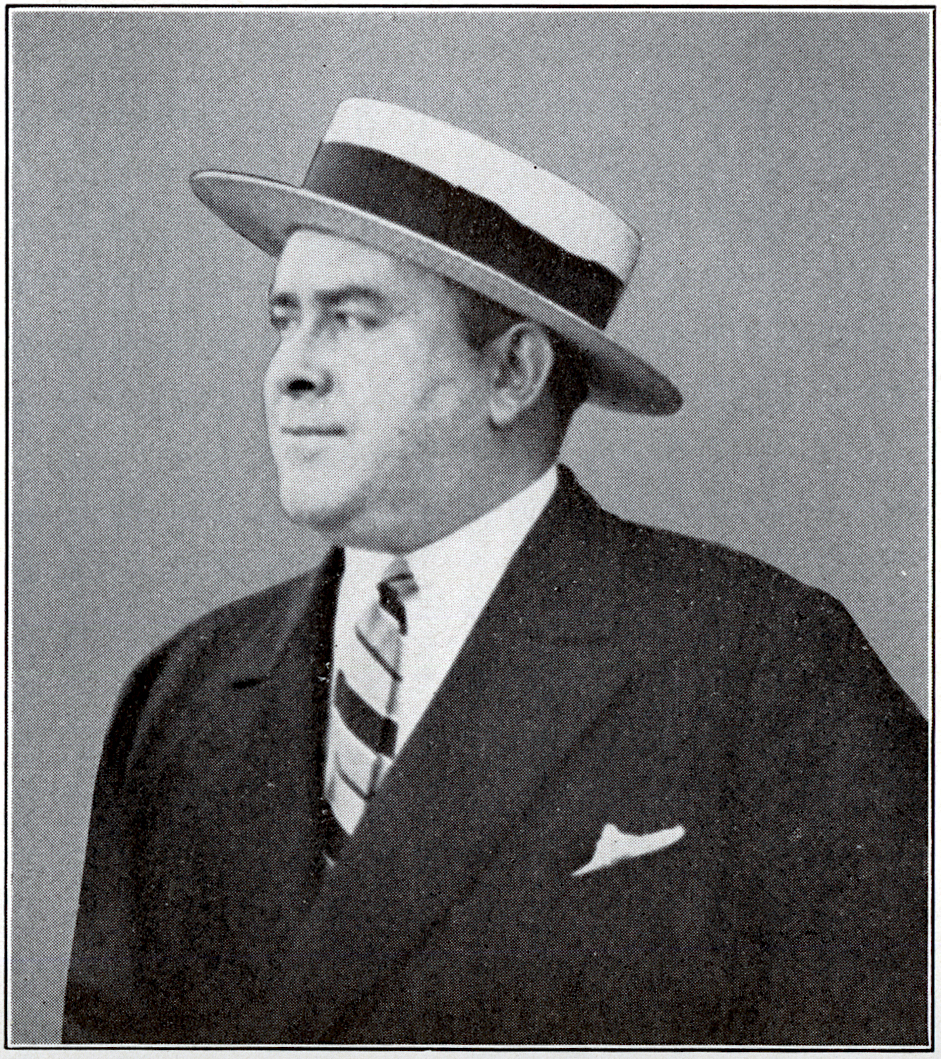
Photo of Louis Jay Heath, courtesy of the Amherst College Library Archives.

Louis Jay Heath (July 14, 1886 – January 8, 1939) was a foreign correspondent for United Press International and one of the first organizers of the American Newspaper Guild. He was an instructor of English at the University of Pittsburgh and the University of Texas at Austin and was co-author of “A New Basis for Social Progress.” Jay Heath was a descendant of a distinguished line of early Americans including two Founding Fathers of the United States: John Jay, the first Chief Justice of the United States and John Adams, the second President of the United States.

Louis Jay Heath graduated from the Cortland Normal School, today SUNY Cortland, in 1906. While at Cortland he became a member of the Delphic Fraternity. He was a graduate of Amherst College (1910) and Harvard University (1912). In addition to teaching English at the University of Pittsburgh from 1912 to 1915 and the University of Texas at Austin from 1917 to 1918, Heath also taught at the United States Naval Academy from 1920 to 1938.

During World War I, Heath served with the Army Medical Corps in England, France and Italy. In 1920 he launched a radio course in health education for the United States Public Health Service and lectured semi-weekly for that bureau for two years.

Heath entered the newspaper field in 1924 when he joined the United Press foreign department. Heath covered Diplomatic Row for the United Press for 15 years, acting as correspondent for 150 newspapers in 21 South and Central American countries. While at the American Newspaper Guild, Jay Heath held continued offices in the Washington Newspaper Guild and the United Press Guild.

Heath, an avid stamp collector, was a member of the Overseas Writers' Club, President of the Washington Airmail Society, and Vice President of the American Airmail Society.

Louis J. Heath was the son of Jay E. and Harriet E. Sears Heath. Heath married Martha Elizabeth Pickels in 1913 and died in 1939 of heart disease at his home in Washington, D.C. Louis Jay Heath is buried at the Cortland Rural Cemetery in his home town of Cortland, New York.
