= List of Colgate University societies =

Since being founded in 1819, Colgate University has had a rich tradition of student societies. Literary societies, Greek letter fraternities and sororities, non-Greek letter organizations, honor societies, and secret societies have all played a part in Colgate history.

Social fraternities came to Colgate in 1850 when Alpha Delta Phi was granted a chapter. The first sorority was brought to Colgate in 1982 when a chapter of Gamma Phi Beta (Gamma Phi) received a charter.

Secret or underground organizations have had a widespread existence at Colgate University. Many of the school's original societies had roots as underground organizations. In terms of secret honor societies, Colgate has also had its fair share. Two secret Honor Societies, the Gorgon's Head and Skull and Scroll, enjoyed a period as rival societies until 1934 when they merged to form Konosioni, now known as the Tredecim Senior Honor Society. Even with its history, Tredecim is no longer a secret society but is now seen as a leadership society, with only 26 members of each graduating class peer-selected to membership.

Following is a list of Colgate University societies, organized by charter date. Active organizations are indicated in bold.

Name	Charter date and range	Type	Status	Ref.
Society for Inquiry	1824	Literary	Inactive	
Gamma Phi	bef. 1833–1840	Literary	Inactive	
Pi Delta	c. 1834–1840	Literary	Inactive	
Adelphian Society	1840–1880	Literary and oration	Inactive	(Note: Became Beta Theta Pi.)
Aeonian Society	1840–1887	Literary and oration	Inactive	(Note: Became Phi Kappa Psi.)
Alpha Delta Phi	1850–1851; 1964–1972	Social fraternity	Inactive	
Delta Kappa Epsilon	1856–2009	Social fraternity	Inactive	
**Delta Upsilon**	1865	Social fraternity	Active	
Aldelphia	1872–1880	Social fraternity	Merged	(Note: Became a chapter of Beta Theta Pi.)
Delta Phi	1874–1876	Social fraternity	Inactive	
Aeonia	1880–1887	Social fraternity	Merged	(Note: Became a chapter of Phi Kappa Psi which, in turn, became Phi Psi.)
Union Debating Society	188x ?–1887	Literary and oration	Merged	(Note: Became a chapter of Phi Gamma Delta.)
Beta Theta Pi	1880	Social fraternity	Active	
**Theta Nu Epsilon**	1880	Social fraternity	Inactive	
Phi Kappa Psi	1887–1982	Social fraternity	Inactive	(Note: Became Phi Psi (local).)
Phi Gamma Delta	1886–1969, 1976–1989	Social fraternity	Inactive	
Madison Club	1902–1917	Literary and oration	Inactive	(Note: Became Alpha Tau Omega.)
Owls Club	1907–1908	Non-Greek fraternal organization	Inactive	(Note: Became Sigma Alpha.)
Gorgon's Head	1908–1934	Secret senior honor society	Merged	(Note: Gorgon's Head and Skull and Scroll merged to form Konosioni.)
Sigma Alpha	1909–1918	Social fraternity	Merged	(Note: Became chapter of Phi Delta Theta.)
Theta Mu	1911–1912	Social fraternity	Merged	(Note: Became a chapter of Theta Chi.)
Skull and Scroll	1912–1934	Secret senior honor society	Merged	
Theta Chi	1912	Social fraternity	Active	
**Theta Delta Sigma**	1914–1917	Social fraternity	Merged	(Note: Chapter became Sigma Nu.)
Lambda Chi Alpha	1916–1972	Social fraternity	Inactive	
Alpha Tau Omega	1917–2000	Social fraternity	Inactive	
Sigma Nu	1917–1968	Social fraternity	Inactive	
Kappa Delta Rho	1917–1972, 1985–2003	Social fraternity	Inactive	
Phi Delta Theta	1918–1968, 1973	Social fraternity	Active	
**Theta Pi Delta**	1923–1930	Social fraternity	Merged	(Note: Became a chapter of Sigma Chi.)
Delta Pi Sigma	1927–1937	Social fraternity	Merge	(Note: Became a chapter of Phi Kappa Tau.)
Colgate Commons Club	1927–1960	Counter-culture fraternal organization	Inactive	
Alpha Psi Omega	1928–May 2023	Honor society, theater	Inactive	
Sigma Chi	1930–1963, 1971–2015	Social fraternity	Inactive	
**Tredecim Senior Honor Society**.(previously Konosioni)	1934–20xx ?	Senior leadership society	Active	(Note: The Konosioni Senior Honor Society changed its name to Tredecim Senior Honor Society.)
**Phi Kappa Tau**	1937–1971, 2007	Social fraternity	Active	(Note: The Phi Kappa Tau chapter left and became Phi Tau (local) in 1971. It later reformed as a colony.)
**Psi Chi**	May 18, 1950	Honor society, psychology	Active	
Alpha Beta	1951–1956	Social fraternity	Merged	(Note: Became a chapter of Tau Kappa Epsilon.)
Tau Kappa Epsilon	1956–1972	Social fraternity	Inactive	
Alpha Chi Epsilon	1960–1964	Social fraternity	Merged	(Note: Was absorbed into Alpha Delta Phi, restarting its chapter at Colgate.)
**Beta Beta Beta**	1971	Honor society, biology	Active	
Phi Tau	1971–20xx ?	Social fraternity, local	Inactive	
Delta Nu	1979–1981	Social sorority	Merged	(Note: Became a chapter of Gamma Phi Beta.)
Delta Sigma Upsilon	1980–1988	Social sorority, local	Inactive	(Note: Became a chapter of Kappa Kappa Gamma.)
Chi Omega Rho	1981–1990	Social fraternity, co-ed, local	Inactive	
**Gamma Phi Beta**	1982	Social sorority	Active	
**Phi Eta Sigma**	1982	First-year academic honor society	Active	
Phi Psi	1982–1992	Social fraternity, local	Inactive	
Alpha Theta Pi	1984–1988	Social sorority, local	Merged	(Note: Became a chapter of Kappa Alpha Theta.)
Kappa Psi Lambda	1984–1986	Social sorority	Merged	(Note: Became a chapter of Pi Beta Phi.)
Zeta Delta Pi	1985–1988	Social sorority	Merged	(Note: Became a chapter of Alpha Chi Omega.)
Pi Beta Phi	1986–1992	Social sorority	Inactive	
Kappa Alpha Theta	1988–2008	Social sorority	Inactive	(Note: Became the local sorority Sorella.)
**Kappa Kappa Gamma**	1988	Social sorority	Active	
Pi Beta Phi	1986–1992	Social sorority	Inactive	
Alpha Chi Omega	1988–1996	Social sorority	Inactive	
**Delta Delta Delta**	1996	Social sorority	Active	
**Brothers of Colgate**	1999	Social fraternity, local	Active	
Alpha Epsilon Pi	2005–2013	Social fraternity	Inactive	
Blue Diamond Society	2006	Social fraternity, local	Active	
**Sorella Society**	2008	Social sorority, local	Active	
