= Lawrence P. Flynn =

Adjutant General of New York (1986–1992)

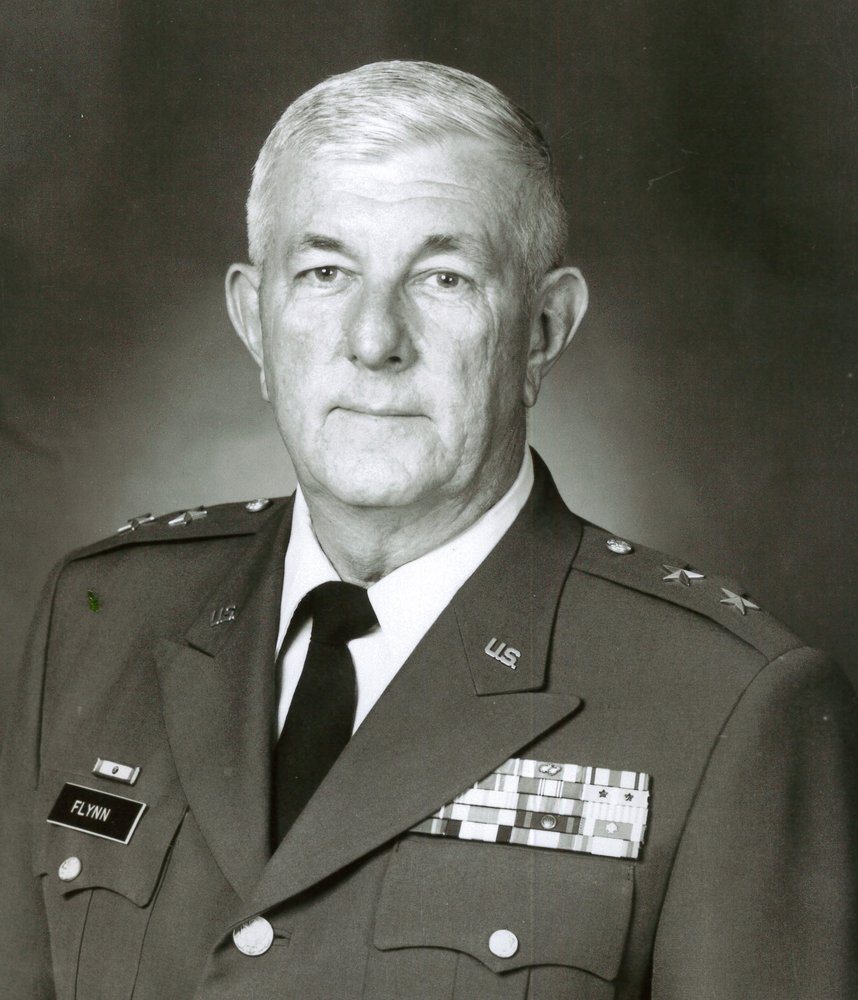
- Flynn as adjutant general, c. 1990
- Born: 9 February 1931; The Bronx, New York, US
- Died: 12 November 2017 (aged 86); Clifton Park, New York, US
- Burial place: Gerald B. H. Solomon Saratoga National Cemetery, Schuylerville, New York, US
- Education: Iona College; Marine Corps Command and Staff College; United States Army Command and General Staff College
- Spouse: Elizabeth Matus (m. 1953–2017)
- Children: 4
- Military career
- Service: United States Marine Corps; United States Army
- Service years: 1947–1973 (Marines); 1973–1992 (National Guard)
- Rank: Major General
- Service number: 052825
- Units: United States Marine Corps Reserve; New York Army National Guard
- Commands: Headquarters and Service Company, 1st Battalion, 7th Marines; Company F, 2nd Battalion, 25th Marines; 2nd Battalion, 25th Marines; Camp Smith, New York; Adjutant General of New York
- Wars: Korean War
- Awards: Army Distinguished Service Medal; Legion of Merit; Meritorious Service Medal; New York State Conspicuous Service Medal

Lawrence P. Flynn (9 February 1931 – 12 November 2017) was a career officer in the US military. A veteran of the Korean War, Flynn served in the United States Marine Corps Reserve and New York Army National Guard. He was appointed Adjutant General of New York in 1986, and he served until retiring in 1992. Flynn's commands included: Company F, 2nd Battalion, 25th Marines; 2nd Battalion, 25th Marines; and the post of Camp Smith, New York. His awards included the Army Distinguished Service Medal, Legion of Merit, and New York State Conspicuous Service Medal.

== Early life and start of career ==
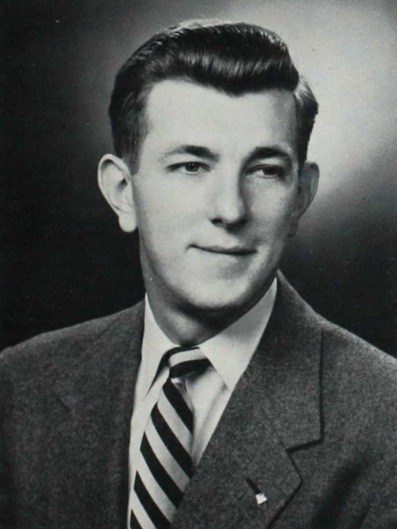
Flynn as an Iona College senior, 1955

Lawrence Pierce Flynn was born in The Bronx, New York on 9 February 1931, a son of Walter Lawrence Flynn and Margaret Mary "Rita" (Glynn) Flynn. He was educated in Bronx schools, and graduated from All Hallows High School in 1948. He was 16 when he joined the United States Marine Corps Reserve on 1 May 1947. He continued to serve in the reserve after graduating from high school and was a corporal when he was activated for Korean War duty in 1950. He was serving as a sergeant when he received his commission as a second lieutenant on 29 May 1951. He graduated from the The Basic School course for officers, then served in combat as a rifle platoon commander with Company B, 1st Battalion, 7th Marines. Near the end of his tour in 1952, he commanded the battalion's Headquarters and Service Company.

After his wartime service, Flynn continued to serve in the Marine Corps Reserve and worked as a sales representative for Procter & Gamble. He graduated from Iona College in 1955 with a Bachelor of Arts degree in economics. Assigned to New Rochelle's Second Rifle Company (Company F, 2nd Battalion, 25th Marines), he served as a rifle platoon commander, weapons platoon commander, and company executive officer. He was promoted to first lieutenant in September 1952 and captain in March 1954. From November 1958 to November 1960, Flynn commanded Company F.

== Continued career ==
In November 1960, Flynn was assigned to the 2nd Battalion headquarters as plans, operations, and training staff officer (S-3). He was promoted to major in August 1961 and served as S-3 until 1965. In 1965, he was assigned as battalion executive officer, and in September 1966 he was promoted to lieutenant colonel. From 1968 to 1970, he commanded 2nd Battalion, 25th Marines. He was then assigned as executive officer of the regiment, and he was promoted to colonel in August 1971.

Beginning in the mid-1960s, Flynn was a member of the New York Naval Militia, where he served as assistant chief of staff for operations and logistics, assistant chief of staff for personnel and administration, and deputy chief of staff for plans and programs. Military education Flynn completed as his career advanced included the: Marine Corps Amphibious Warfare School (1963); U.S Navy Attack Transport/Cargo Ship Embarkation School (1965); and Senior Officers Orientation Course on Civil Disturbance (1968). He graduated from the Marine Corps Command and Staff College in 1968. In 1973, he completed the course at the United States Army Command and General Staff College. He completed the course at the U.S Air Force Air Ground Operations School in 1974. Also in 1974, he graduated from the U.S. Army Installation Management Course.

== Later career ==
In 1973, Flynn transferred his military membership from the Marine Corps Reserve to the New York Army National Guard; commissioned as a colonel, he was assigned to command the post at Camp Smith. In 1978 he was appointed as New York's adjutant general. (Note: In most states, the adjutant general is the head of the National Guard. In New York, the head of the National Guard was titled chief of staff to the governor beginning in 1948, and the adjutant general was an administrator subordinate to the chief of staff and vice chief of staff. A law passed in 1988 changed the title of the National Guard's senior officer back to adjutant general.) In February 1979, Flynn was promoted to brigadier general. In 1983, he was assigned as vice chief of staff to the governor and deputy commander of the New York Army National Guard. In April 1986, Flynn was appointed as chief of staff to the governor and commanding general of the New York Army National Guard. This assignment included promotion to major general. Flynn's term was marked by efforts to maintain funding and equipment for the National Guard following the end of the Cold War and oversight of the state's contribution to forces deployed for the Gulf War. He retired in July 1992 and was succeeded by Michael S. Hall.

Flynn was a member of the National Guard Association of the United States, Militia Association of New York (past president), Marine Corps Reserve Officers Association (past director), and Squadron "A" Association (past board of governors member). He was also a member of Commack Citizens for the Public Schools (past president) and a member of the town of Niskayuna's ethics committee. His awards included the: Army Distinguished Service Medal; Legion of Merit; Meritorious Service Medal with two oak leaf clusters; and New York State Conspicuous Service Medal with devices for second and third award. Flynn died in Clifton Park, New York on 12 November 2017. He was buried at Gerald B. H. Solomon Saratoga National Cemetery in Schuylerville, New York.
