= Michael S. Hall =

Adjutant General of New York (1992–1995)

- Hall in 1991
- Born: 12 April 1947 (age 79); Ithaca, New York, US
- Education: Cornell University; Air Command and Staff College; Industrial College of the Armed Forces
- Spouse: Sheela Maureen Fertig (m. 1970)
- Children: 1
- Military career
- Service: United States Air Force
- Service years: 1968–1995
- Rank: Major General
- Unit: New York Air National Guard
- Commands: 174th Attack Wing; Adjutant General of New York
- Wars: Gulf War
- Awards: Legion of Merit; Meritorious Service Medal
- Other work: Director, Ithaca Tompkins International Airport; President and Chief Executive Officer, Wings of Eagles Discovery Center

Michael Steven Hall (born 12 April 1947) was a career officer in the United States Air Force. A longtime member of the New York Air National Guard, he served from 1968 to 1995 and was a veteran of the Gulf War. Hall was assigned as adjutant general of New York with the rank of major general from 1992 until his retirement. His awards and decorations included the Legion of Merit.

== Early life and start of career ==
Michael S. Hall was born in Ithaca, New York on 12 April 1947, a son of A. James Hall Sr. and Emilie (Towner) Hall. He was raised and educated in Ithaca and graduated from Ithaca High School in 1964. Hall attended Cornell University from 1964 to 1968 and graduated with a Bachelor of Science degree in biological sciences. While in college, Hall participated in the Air Force Reserve Officer Training Corps and at graduation he received his commission as a second lieutenant.

Hall underwent pilot training and qualified on the F-102 interceptor pilot, after which he was assigned to Perrin Air Force Base, Texas. He subsequently qualified on the F-106 interceptor and was assigned to Malmstrom Air Force Base, Montana. From August 1971 to July 1973, he was assigned to duty as an F-106 pilot at Griffiss Air Force Base, New York.

=== Family ===
In 1970, Hall married Sheela Maureen Fertig. They are the parents of a son, Bryan.

== Continued career ==
After joining the Air Guard, Hall was a longtime member of the 174th Tactical Fighter Group. His flying, staff, and command assignments included A-37B pilot, safety officer, and director of operations. In 1979 he was appointed vice commander of the 174th Tactical Fighter Wing (now the 174th Attack Wing), and he served in this post until he was assigned as wing commander in 1986. Hall also became qualified as a pilot of the F-16.

During the Gulf War, Hall was assigned as theater air liaison officer for United States Air Forces Central, responsible for coordinating air support to United States Central Command's ground forces. After the war, he resumed command of the 174th Tactical Fighter Wing.

=== Military education ===
- Squadron Officer School, 1974
- Air Command and Staff College, 1978
- National Security Management Course, Industrial College of the Armed Forces, 1980

== Later career ==
In 1992, Hall was a resident of Dryden when he was appointed to succeed Lawrence P. Flynn as adjutant general of New York with the rank of major general. He continued in this position until May 1995, when he retired from the military and was succeeded by John H. Fenimore V. Hall's awards and decorations included the Legion of Merit, Meritorious Service Medal, Air Force Outstanding Unit Award, and Air Force Longevity Service Award.

After leaving the National Guard, Hall's career included appointment as director of the Ithaca Tompkins International Airport. In addition, he served as president and chief executive officer for the Wings of Eagles Discovery Center, an aviation museum at the Elmira Corning Regional Airport.
