= 153d Airlift Wing =

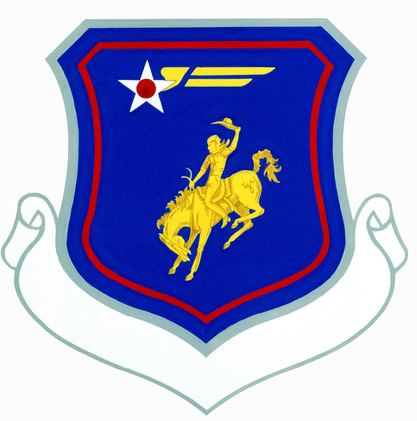
153d Airlift Wing

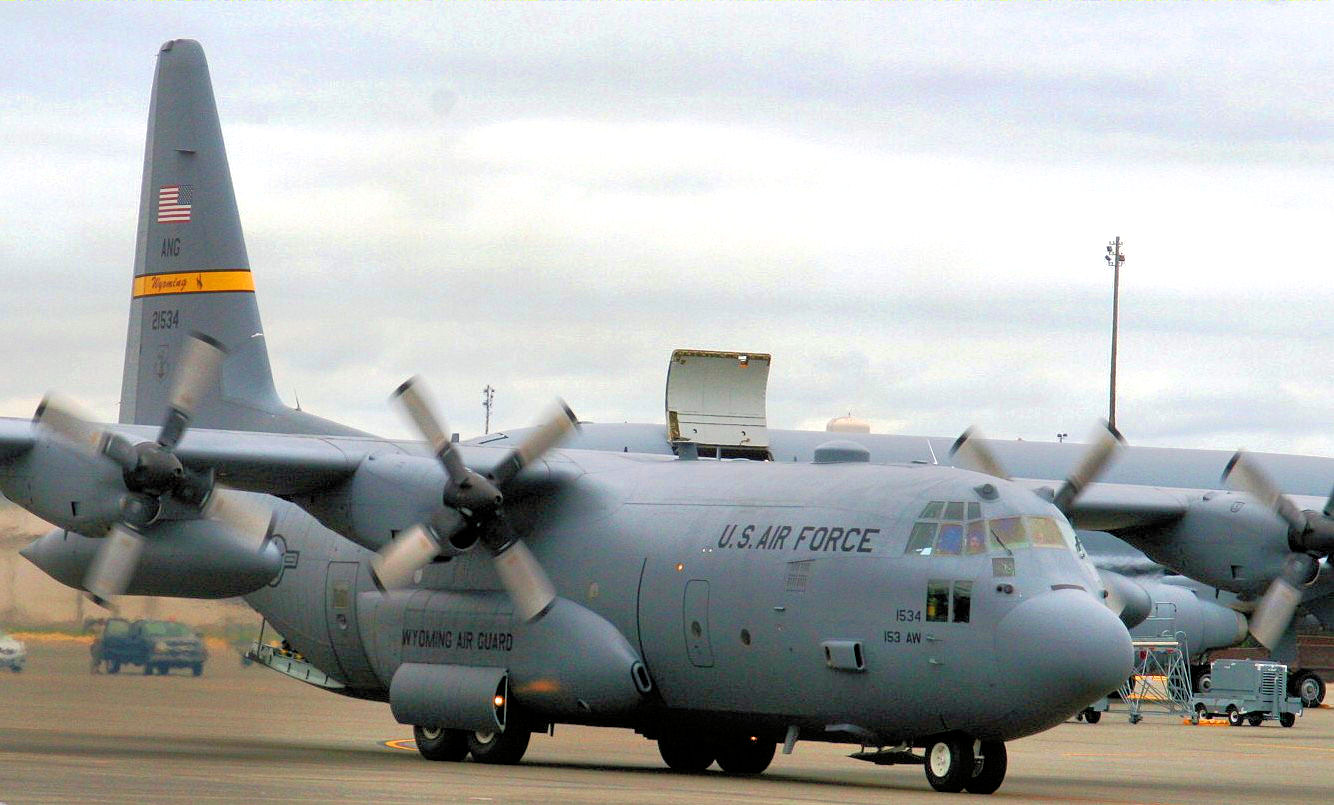
- 187th Airlift Squadron C-130H Hercules (Note: Aircraft is Lockheed C-130H Hercules, serial 92-1534.)
- Active: 1957–present
- Country: United States
- Branch: Air National Guard
- Type: Wing
- Role: Airlift and Aerial firefighting
- Size: 1100
- Part of: Wyoming Air National Guard
- Garrison/HQ: Cheyenne Air National Guard Base, Cheyenne, Wyoming

Insignia
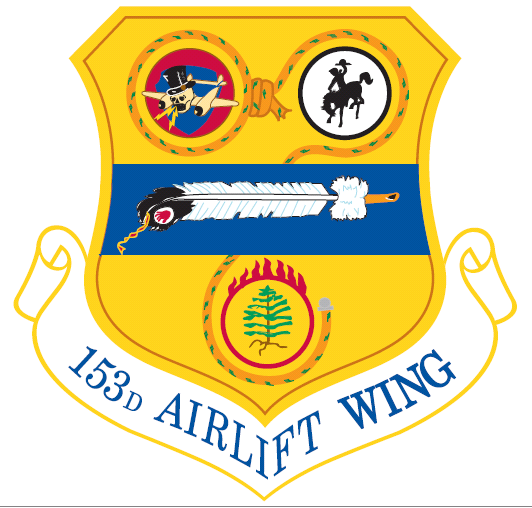
- 153d Airlift Wing emblem
- Tail stripe: Yellow stripe "Wyoming"

The 153d Airlift Wing is a unit of the Wyoming Air National Guard, stationed at Cheyenne Air National Guard Base, Wyoming. If activated to federal service, the Wing is gained by the United States Air Force Air Mobility Command.

== Mission ==
The 153rd Airlift Wing's C-130 Hercules mission is to perform the tactical portion of the airlift mission. The aircraft is capable of operating from rough, dirt strips and is the prime transport for air dropping troops and equipment into hostile areas. The C-130 performs a diverse number of roles, including airlift support, Antarctic ice resupply, aeromedical missions, weather reconnaissance, aerial spray missions, firefighting duties for the U.S. Forest Service and natural disaster relief missions.

== Units ==
The 153d Airlift Wing consists of the following units:

- 153d Airlift Wing
  - 153rd Operations Group
    - 187th Airlift Squadron
    - 187th Operations Support Squadron
    - 187th Aeromedical Evacuation Squadron
    - 243rd Air Traffic Control Squadron
  - 153rd Maintenance Group
    - 153rd Maintenance Squadron
    - 153rd Aircraft Maintenance Squadron
    - 153rd Maintenance Operations Flight
  - 153rd Mission Support Group
    - 153rd Civil Engineer Squadron
    - 153rd Command and Control Squadron
    - 153rd Communications Flight
    - 153rd Force Support Squadron
    - 153rd Logistics Readiness Squadron
    - 153rd Security Forces Squadron
  - 153rd Medical Group

== History ==
On 1 July 1957, the Wyoming Air National Guard 187th Fighter-Interceptor Squadron was authorized to expand to a group level, and the 153d Fighter Group (Air Defense) was established by the National Guard Bureau. The 187th becoming the group's flying squadron. Other squadrons assigned into the group were the 153d Headquarters, 153d Material Squadron (Maintenance), 153d Combat Support Squadron, and the 153d USAF Dispensary. The 153d being assigned to the 34th Air Division, Air Defense Command and upgraded to North American F-86L Sabres.

=== Airlift mission ===
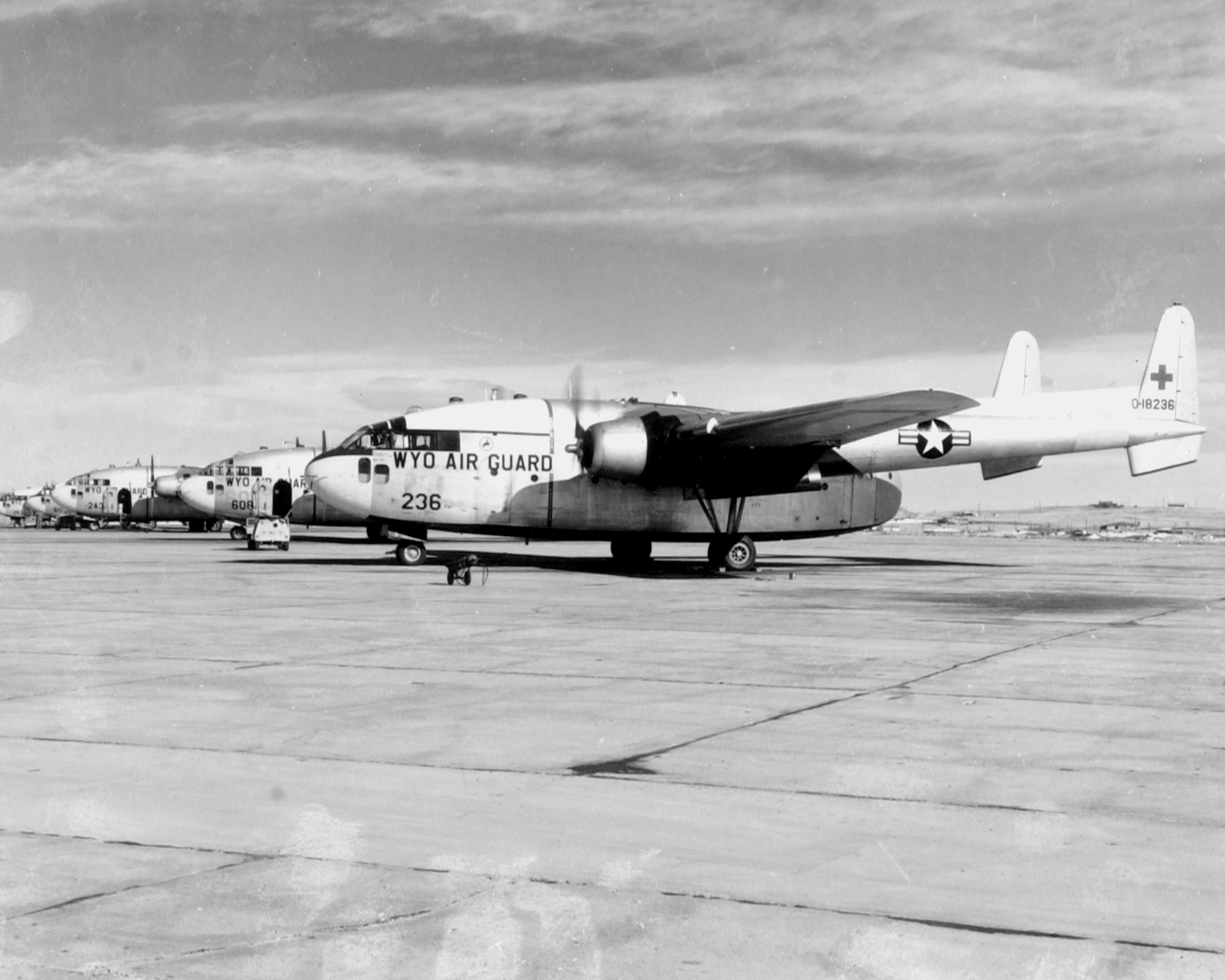
Fairchild C-119C Flying Boxcar 51-8236 from the 153rd Aeromedical Transport Squadron

The most dramatic change came for the Wyoming unit in 1961 when it changed from an Air Defense Command Fighter-Interceptor unit to flying C-119 Flying Boxcars and airlifting medical patients, with the newly designated 187th Aeromedical Transport Squadron becoming part of Military Air Transport Service (MATS).

On 21 June 1963 the 187th received Lockheed C-121 Super Constellation aircraft and expanded its military airlift role to worldwide mission capabilities. Entering the realm of Southeast Asia and the Vietnam War, the Wyoming Air Guard flew its first mission into the Southeast Asia theater combat zone in late 1964, and continued to do so throughout the Vietnam War years. In January 1966, the unit became the 153d Military Airlift Group [153d MAG], under the Military Airlift Command.

In 1972, the 187th received its first turboprop Lockheed C-130B Hercules aircraft, and became a tactical airlift squadron. The C-130 is one of the toughest and most versatile aircraft ever built, and which the unit continues to fly over 40 years later. In 1975, the Wyoming Air Guard was selected for the special role of aerial fire fighting. Two Wyoming C-130s were equipped with Modular Airborne FireFighting System (MAFFS) and began water/fire retardant bombing of fires throughout the United States. Those fire fighting missions still continue through the present.

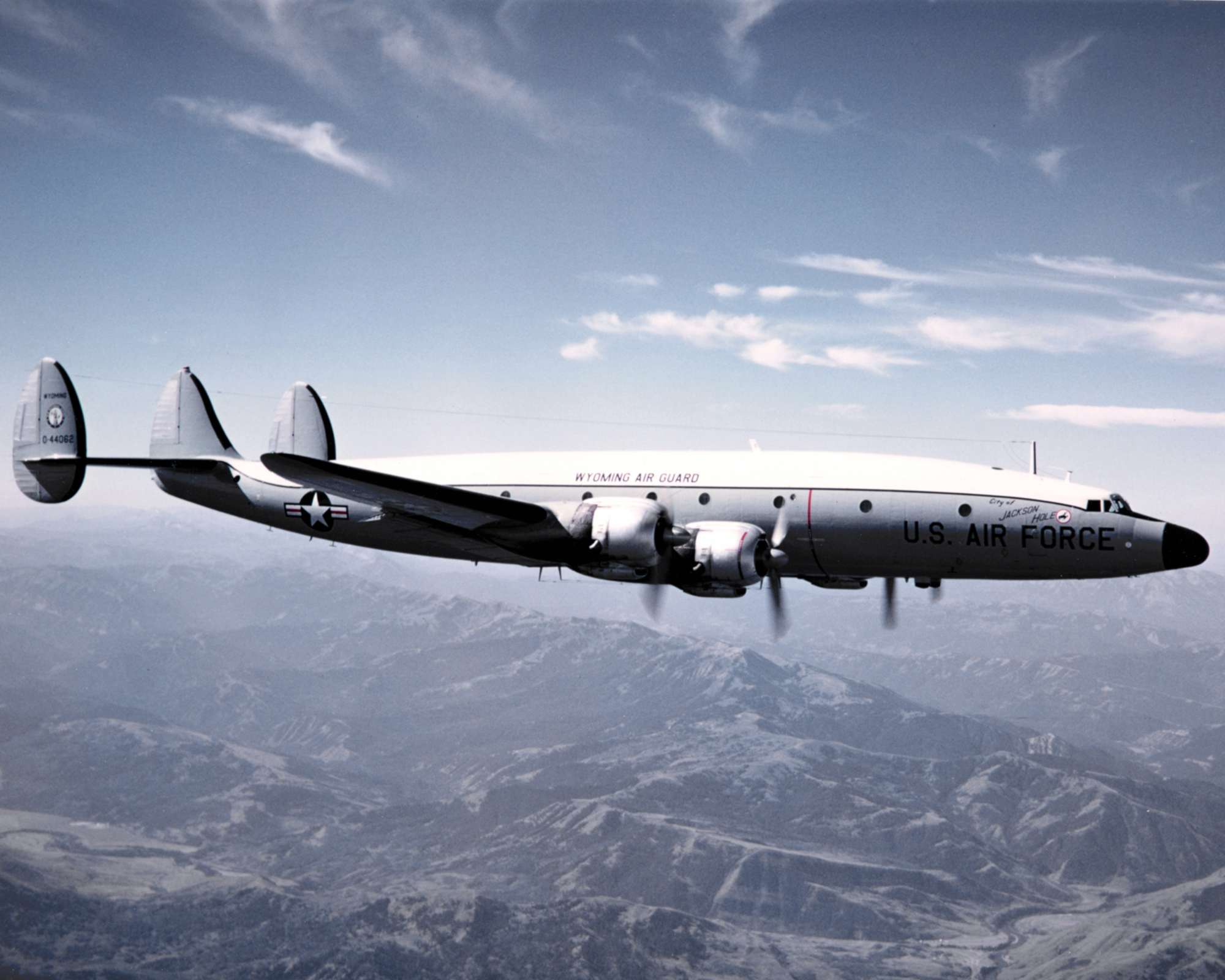
The 153d ATG operated the C-121G from 1963 to 1972.

In the meantime, the 153d Tactical Airlift Group expanded to regularly flying missions with the US Southern Command out of Howard AFB, Panama, as part of Operation Phoenix Oak. From supplying embassies in Central and South America, to searching for sinking ships in the middle of tropical storms, the Wyoming C-130s and aircrews have carried out military and humanitarian missions, right up to the present day. Those missions continued through Operation Just Cause in 1989-90 when Panama was designated a combat zone.

Beginning 5 August 1990, the first day of Operation Desert Shield, and into Operation Desert Storm the Wyoming Air Guard flew continental U.S. and Central and South America missions. During that time, the Wyoming 187th Aeromedical Evacuation Flight and the 153d Clinic were both activated by order of the President of the United States, with a large number of those medical personnel being sent to Saudi Arabia. After the hostilities, Wyoming Guard members continued with Operation Provide Comfort, which supplied humanitarian aid to Kurdish people displaced by the Iraqi military.

In April 1997 the Wyoming 153d Airlift Wing was reassigned to the Air Mobility Command, and continued its federal and state airlift, fire fighting, and humanitarian missions. From 10 November – 5 December 1997, the Wyoming Air National Guard flew 250 airborne fire-fighting missions in the jungles of Indonesia as Operation Thrust Rapid, No. 1. This was the first time U.S. airborne fire fighting had ever been done outside of the continental U.S.

=== Global war on terrorism ===
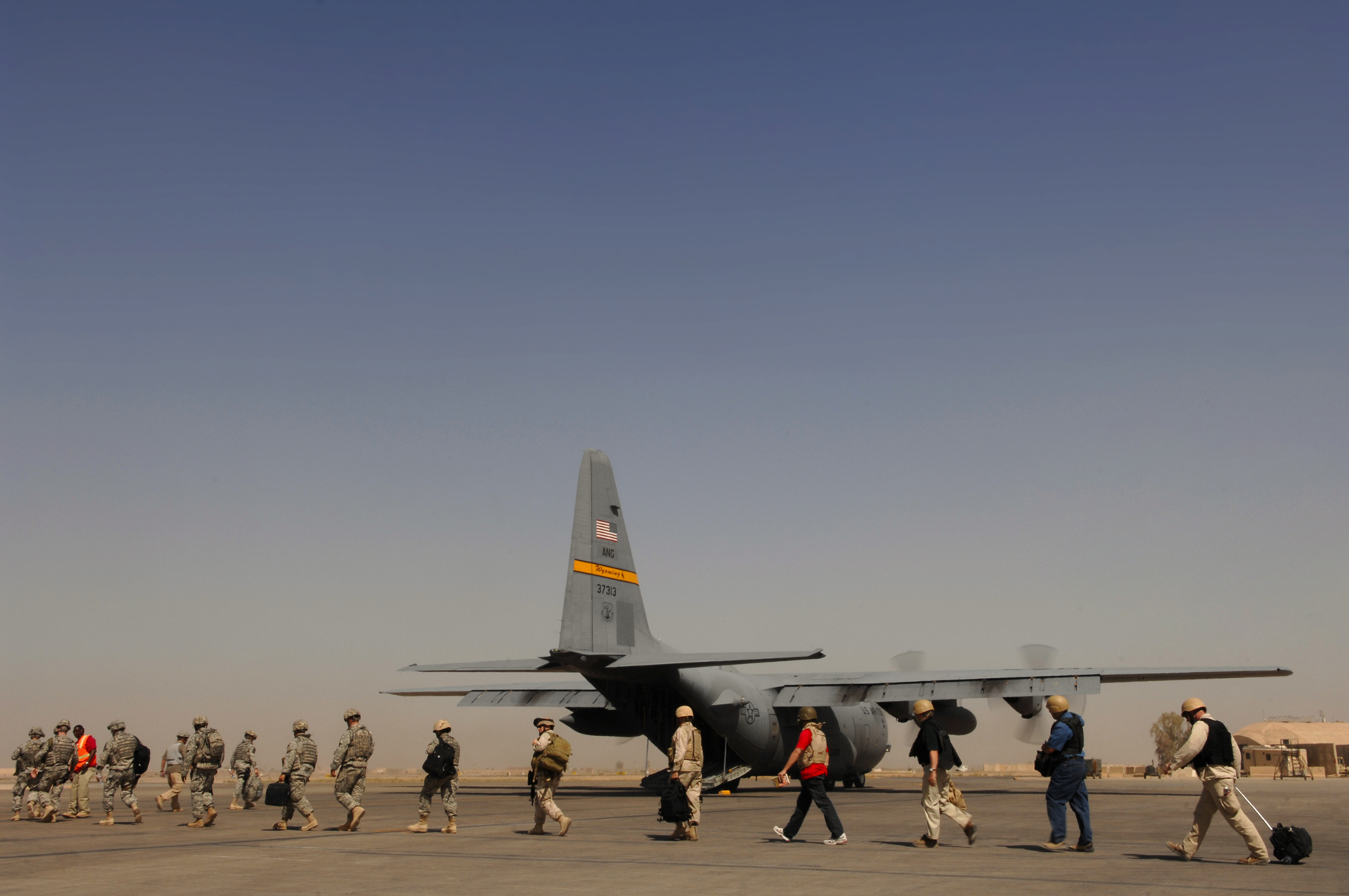
A Wyoming ANG C-130H at Balad, Iraq, 2008.

As with the rest of the U.S. military, the wing's focus changed abruptly on 11 September 2001. Responding immediately, the 153 AW became the first unit to resume flying, by answering the call to ferry blood donations around the western United States. By the end of September virtually all of the 153rd Security Forces Squadron had been called to active duty and assigned to active Air Force bases. As a result, numerous individuals volunteered to be activated as security forces augmentees, an assignment that lasted half a year for many. Three others volunteered for temporary civilian airport security duties.

As preparations to invade Iraq continued, with continued operations in Afghanistan still underway, the 153rd Airlift Wing repeatedly deployed. In addition to its ongoing commitment to MAFFS, Operation Joint Forge in Europe, and Coronet Oak in Latin America, the 153 AW maintained a two-year-long, two-aircraft commitment to Operation Iraqi Freedom during 2004–2005.

In 2006 and 2007 the unit returned to Afghanistan for two and three aircraft Aerospace Expeditionary Force rotations. On the home front, the end of 2007 found four aircraft responding to the great 2007 California wildfires.

In Cheyenne the period 2004-2007 witnessed the 153rd receiving a remodeled dining facility, a new petroleum oils and lubricants facility, a new air operations building for air traffic control and aerial port, and approval of a new squadrons operations building. Numerous temporary modular buildings also supported the unit.

The time period 2006-2007 also witnessed a unique combination of active duty and National Guard forces in Cheyenne. In July 2006 the 30th Airlift Squadron, an active duty unit, stood up in Cheyenne, under the operational direction of the 153rd. Known as an active associate unit, the addition of the 30th resulted in the 153rd receiving an additional four C-130 aircraft during 2007, and increased the wing's aircraft strength from eight to twelve aircraft.

== Lineage ==
- Designated 153d Fighter Group (Air Defense) and allotted to Wyoming ANG, 1957

Extended federal recognition and activated on 1 July 1957
Redesignated 153d Aeromedical Transport Group, Light on 1 May 1961
Redesignated 153d Air Transport Group, Heavy on 8 February 1964
Redesignated 153d Military Airlift Group on 1 January 1966
Redesignated 153d Tactical Airlift Group on 13 July 1972
Redesignated 153d Airlift Group on 15 March 1992
Redesignated 153d Airlift Wing on 1 October 1995

=== Assignments ===
- 140th Air Defense Wing, 1 Jul 1957
- Wyoming Air National Guard, 1 January 1961

Gained by: 34th Air Division, Air Defense Command
Gained by: Western Transport Air Force, (WESTAF), Military Air Transport Service, 1 May 1961
Gained by: Twenty-Second Air Force, Military Airlift Command, 8 January 1966
Gained by: Air Combat Command, 1 June 1992
Gained by: Air Mobility Command, 1 June 1993 – present

=== Components ===
- 153d Operations Group, 1 October 1995 – Present
- 187th Fighter-Interceptor Squadron (later 187th Aeromedical Transport Squadron, 187th Air Transport Squadron, 187th Military Airlift Squadron, 187th Tactical Airlift Squadron, 187th Airlift Squadron, 1 July 1957 – 1 October 1995

=== Stations ===
- Cheyenne Municipal Airport, Wyoming, 1 July 1957

Designated: Cheyenne Air National Guard Base, Wyoming, 1991 – present

=== Aircraft ===
- F-86L Sabre, 1957-1961
- C/MC-119J Flying Boxcar, 1961-1963
- C-121G Constellation, 1963-1972
- C-130B Hercules, 1972-1994
- C-130H Hercules, 1993 – present
- C-130J Super Hercules, 2028 – onwards
