= R. Paul Higgins =

Medical doctor and higher education officer

Dr. R. Paul Higgins Sr. (Photo courtesy of the Cortland County Historical Society.)

Dr. Reuben Paul Higgins Sr. (September 27, 1880 – January 13, 1949) was a prominent physician and higher education officer from Cortland County in New York state. He was president of the Cortland County Medical Society, a member of the New York State Medical Society and the American Medical Association, and held a fellowship in the American College of Surgeons.

== Early life and career ==
R. Paul Higgins was born to Dr. Francis W. and Kittie Smith Higgins in McGraw, New York. The younger Higgins graduated from the Cortland Normal School in 1898. While at the normal school, R. Paul Higgins became a member of the Young Men's Debating Club (which later became the Delphic Fraternity.)

Dr. R. Paul Higgins served on the Cortland Board of Education. He also served on the board of visitors at the Cortland State Teachers College from 1917-1948, holding the position of president during the last twenty-four years of his tenure. Higgins Hall, on the campus of the State University of New York at Cortland, was named in his honor.

After graduating from the normal school, Higgins attended Cornell University, where he earned a Bachelor of Arts degree in 1902. He then attended Johns Hopkins University in Baltimore, graduating with the degree of Doctor of Medicine in 1905.

The Cortland Memorial Foundation established the Higgins Society in tribute to the clinical excellence, compassion, and volunteerism of the Higgins family of physicians.

Dr. R. Paul Higgins Sr. was a 33rd degree Mason, attending the Masonic Cortlandville Lodge. He was also a member of the Cortland Country Club, the Cortland Rotary Club, and the First Presbyterian Church of Cortland.

== Personal life ==
Dr. Higgins was married to Mabel Brewer Higgins. The couple had three children, including Dr. R. Paul Higgins Jr.

== Sources ==
- Cortland Standard, January 13 & February 4, 1949.
- Higgins Hall, SUNY Cortland.
