= Paul Higgins (footballer) =

Australian rules footballer

Personal information
- Full name: Paul William Higgins
- Born: 8 March 1946
- Died: 15 February 2016 (aged 69)
- Original team: Assumption College
- Height: 175 cm (5 ft 9 in)
- Weight: 75 kg (165 lb)

Playing career^{1}
Years	Club	Games (Goals)
1965	South Melbourne	2 (1)
- ^{1} Playing statistics correct to the end of 1965.

Paul Higgins (8 March 1946 – 15 February 2016) was an Australian rules footballer who played for the South Melbourne Football Club in the Victorian Football League (VFL).

Higgins was a detective with Victorian Police. In 1987 he was arrested and charged with corruption. In one of Australia's longest and most expensive trials, he was found guilty and sentenced to seven years in jail.
