= 30th Airlift Squadron =

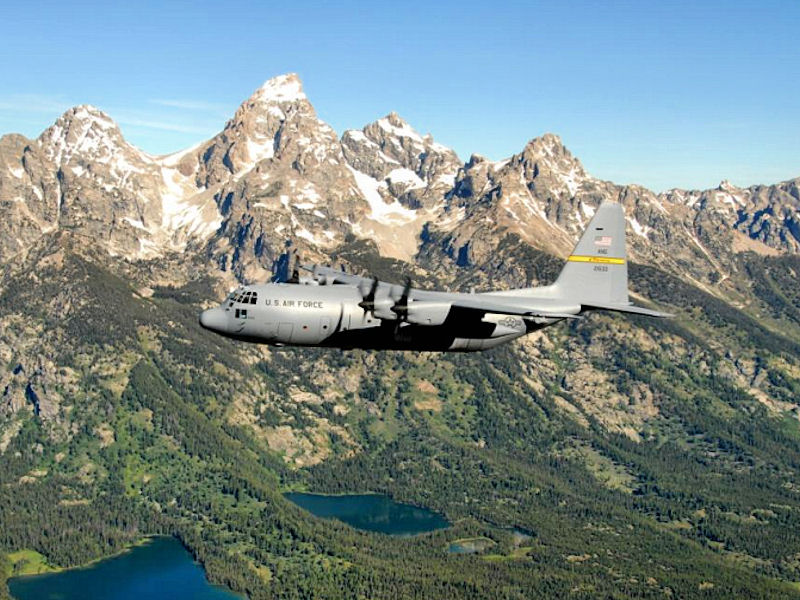
- 153d Airlift Wing C-130 Hercules over the Rockies
- Active: 1942–1943; 1952–1965; 1967–2003; 2006–2015
- Country: United States
- Branch: United States Air Force
- Role: Airlift
- Mottos: Ubivis Quando Vis (Latin for 'Anytime, Anywhere You Want+')
- Decorations: Air Force Meritorious Unit Award; Air Force Outstanding Unit Award; Republic of Vietnam Gallantry Cross with Palm

Insignia
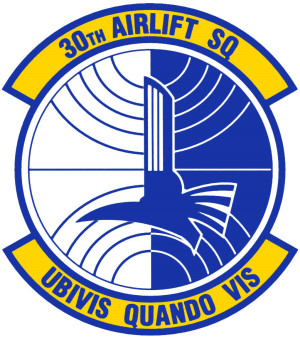
- 30th Airlift Squadron emblem (Note: Modified in 1994. Endicott, p. 511 (star removed).)

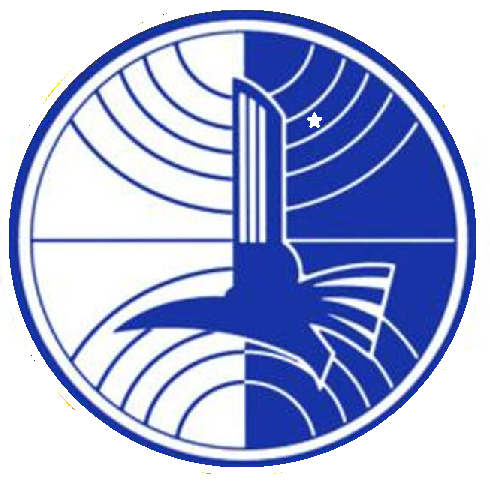
- 30th Air Transport Squadron emblem (Note: Approved 27 May 1960.)

The 30th Airlift Squadron is an inactive United States Air Force unit, last assigned to the 19th Airlift Wing. It was the first active-duty associate unit attached to an Air National Guard wing, working with the 187th Airlift Squadron at Cheyenne Regional Airport (National Guard Base), Wyoming. It operated the Lockheed C-130 Hercules aircraft of its co-located Guard unit, conducting airlift missions. The squadron was last active in this role from 2006 until about 1 September 2015.

The squadron was first activated in 1942 as the 30th Ferrying Squadron. It ferried aircraft across the North Atlantic ferry route until it was disbanded in 1943 in a reorganization of Air Transport Command units. The squadron was reactivated in 1952 as the 30th Air Transport Squadron. Except for a brief period from 1965 to 1967, it conducted strategic airlift missions throughout the world until 1993, when it moved to Yokota Air Base, Japan and conducted aeromedical airlift missions until inactivating in 2003.

== History ==
=== World War II ===
The squadron was first activated at Presque Isle Army Air Field, Maine in late July 1942 as the 30th Ferrying Squadron, one of the original squadrons of the 8th Ferrying Group. In August, the 8th Group squadrons were moved to various bases along the North Atlantic ferrying route and the squadron moved to Bluie West One, at Narsarsuak, Greenland. The 30th ferried bombers and Lockheed P-38 Lightning aircraft until August 1943. On 1 September 1943, the squadron, now titled the 30th Transport Squadron, was disbanded, and its personnel and equipment transferred to Station 11, North Atlantic Wing, Air Transport Command.

=== Cold War airlift ===
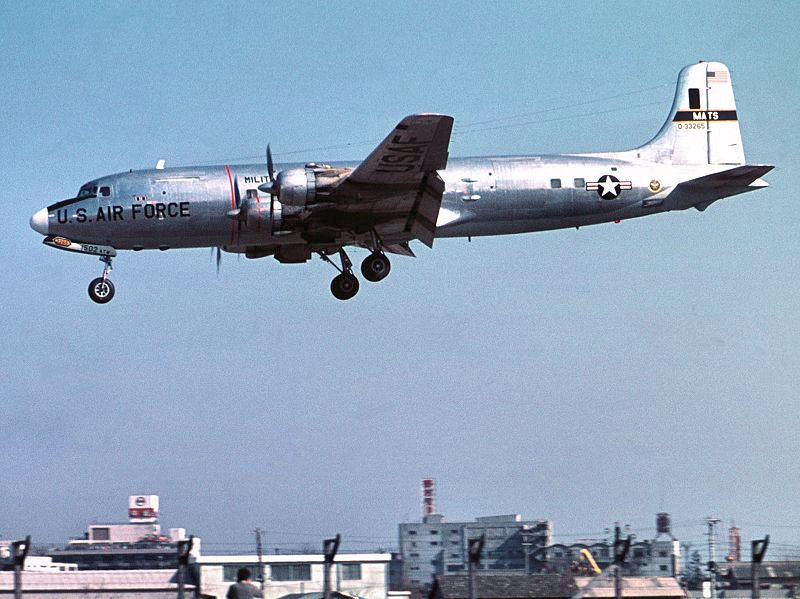
MATS Douglas C-118A Liftmaster

In July 1952 Military Air Transport Service replaced its Major Command Controlled air transport squadrons (4 digit) with Air Force Controlled squadrons that were able to continue their history if they were temporarily inactive. (Note: Under the USAF organization and lineage system MAJCON units' lineages (histories, awards, and battle honors) ended with their discontinuance and could never be revived. Ravenstein, Guide to Lineage and Honors, p. 12.) Implementing this program, the 30th, now the 30th Air Transport Squadron was activated at Westover Air Force Base, Massachusetts, where it was assigned to the 1600th Air Transport Group and took over the personnel and eight Douglas C-74 Globemaster aircraft of the 1253d Air Transport Squadron, which was discontinued. The squadron began to convert to Douglas C-54 Skymaster transports shortly after activation, but this conversion was cancelled and the unit reverted to flying Douglas C-118 Liftmasters in August.

Although the squadron continued to fly C-118s, by 1954, the advent of larger transport aircraft, such as the c-74 and the Douglas C-124 Globemaster II prompted the Air Force to change its designation from a heavy transport squadron to a medium transport unit. In April 1955, Strategic Air Command took over Westover from MATS. The 1600th Air Transport Wing was inactivated, but the squadron moved its operations to McGuire Air Force Base, New Jersey. It provided air transport for the Atlantic Division of the Military Air Transport Service from July 1952 until inactivating in June 1965, when the 1611th Air Transport Wing discontinued its C-118 operations.

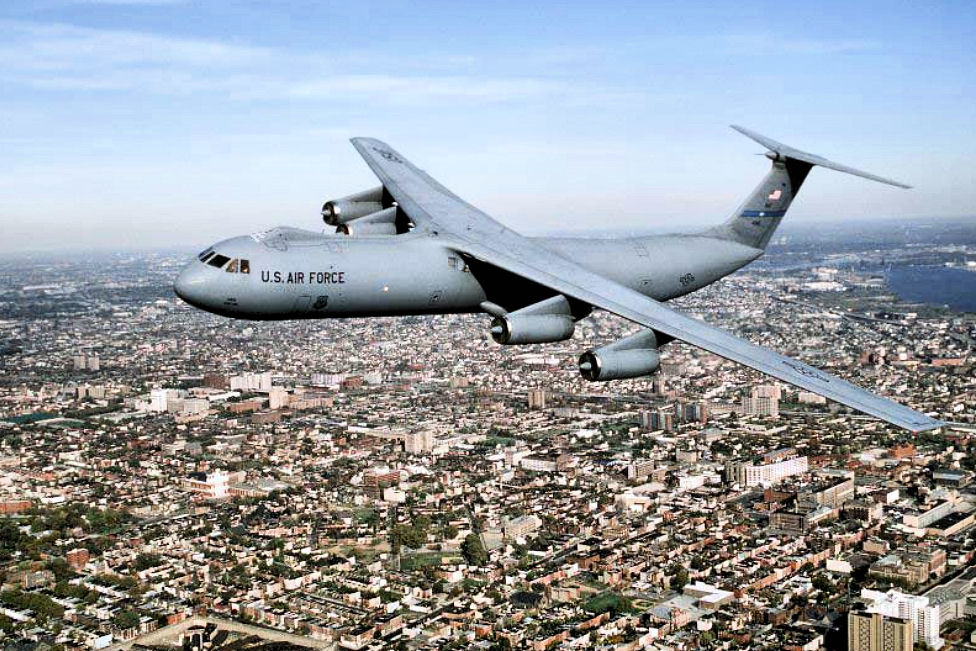
438th Airlift Wing C-141 over Philadelphia

The squadron was organized again in April 1967 as the 30th Military Airlift Squadron and equipped with Lockheed C-141 Starlifters. Starting in August, conducted worldwide airlift, including support for the Vietnam War, earning a Republic of Vietnam Gallantry Cross with Palm for its support.

It supported Operation Desert Storm in Southwest Asia from August 1990 to June 1991. Other operations included Operation Just Cause, Operation Iraqi Freedom and Operation Enduring Freedom

=== Aeromedical Airlift ===
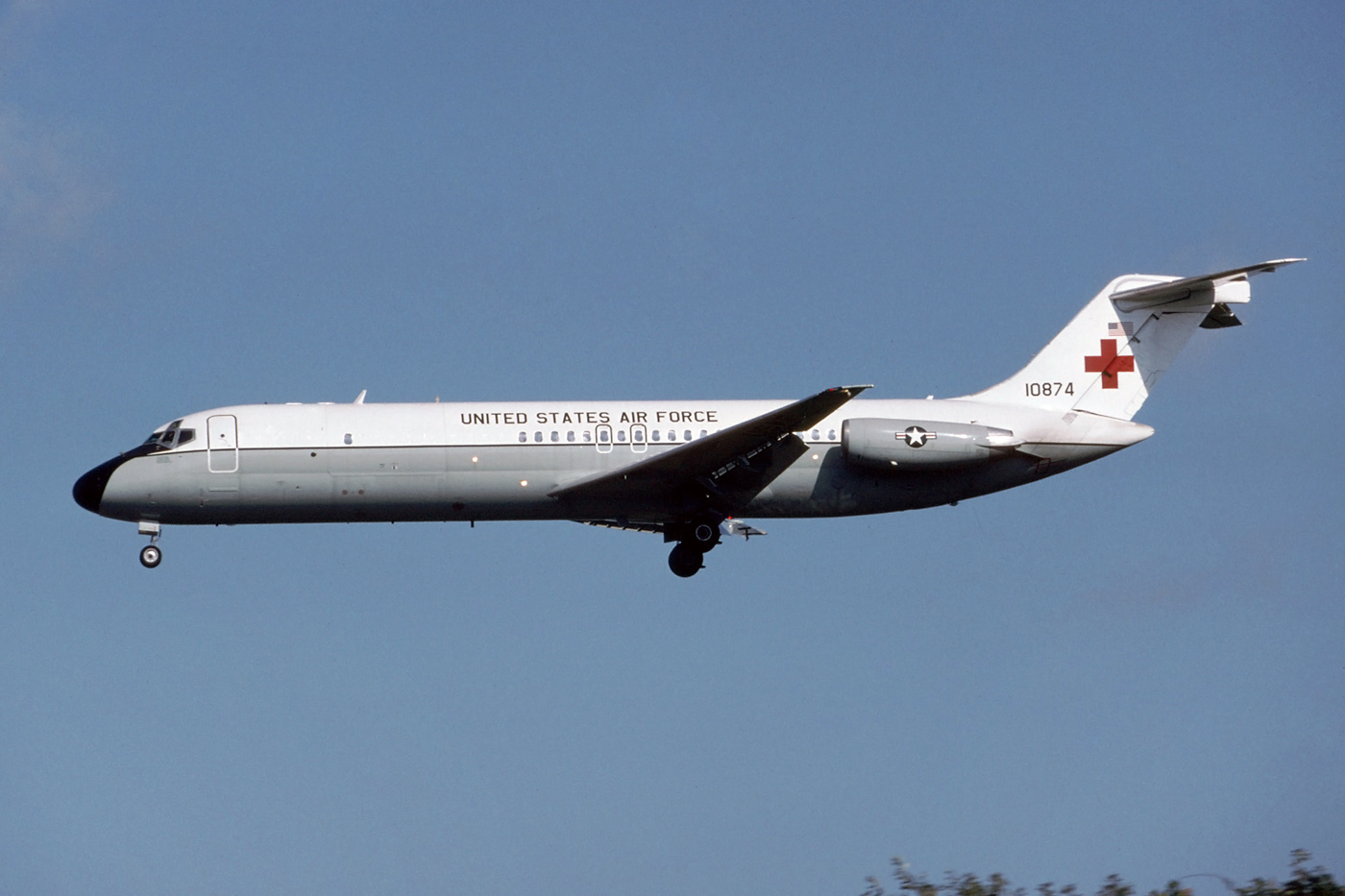
Squadron C-9A approaching Misawa Air Base, Japan

In 1993 the squadron moved to Yokota Air Base, Japan where it flew aeromedical evacuation missions with the McDonnell Douglas C-9 Nightingale until 2003, when the Nightingale was retired and the squadron was inactivated.

=== Active duty associate ===
On 8 July 2006 the 30th became the first active-duty associate unit partnering with the Wyoming Air National Guard's 153d Airlift Wing. As an associate unit, the squadron flies the Lockheed C-130 Hercules aircraft of the 153d Wing on tactical airlift missions in the "Total Force Integration" concept. Although its administrative headquarters is an active duty group, it is under the operational control of the 153d Wing. Housing, medical, and other support is provided by the 90th Mission Support Group at Francis E. Warren Air Force Base. The 153d Wing added five aircraft to support this program, which was implemented as a result of the 2005 Base Realignment and Closure Commission.

Members of the squadron deployed to both Iraq and Afghanistan after its reactivation, including supporting *Operation New Dawn, although the squadron does not appear to have deployed as a unit. In 2014, two consecutive commanders of the squadron were relieved of command, as the unit went through four commanders in less than a year. The reliefs were due to a "lack of confidence" in the commanders involved and the atmosphere in the squadron, although no additional information was publicly released. On 1 September 2015, due to budget cuts, the active duty airmen and their aircraft were withdrawn from Wyoming and the aircraft were transferred to the 152d Airlift Wing of the Nevada Air National Guard by the following month.

== Lineage ==
- Constituted as the 30th Ferrying Squadron on 9 July 1942

Activated on 25 July 1942
Redesignated 30th Transport Squadron on 24 March 1943
Disbanded on 1 September 1943

- Reconstituted and redesignated 30th Air Transport Squadron, Heavy on 20 June 1952

Activated on 20 July 1952
Redesignated 30th Air Transport Squadron, Medium on 18 July 1954
Discontinued on 25 June 1965

- Redesignated 30th Military Airlift Squadron and activated on 13 January 1967 (not organized)

Organized on 8 April 1967

- Redesignated 30th Airlift Squadron on 1 November 1991

Inactivated on 1 September 2003
Activated on 1 July 2006
Inactivated c. 1 September 2015

=== Assignments ===
- 8th Ferrying Group (later 8th Transport Group), 25 July 1942 – 1 September 1943
- 1600th Air Transport Group, 20 July 1952
- 1611th Air Transport Group, 16 May 1955
- 1611th Air Transport Wing, 18 January 1963 – 25 June 1965
- Military Airlift Command, 13 January 1967 (not organized)
- 438th Military Airlift Wing, 8 April 1967
- 438th Military Airlift Group, 1 October 1978
- 438th Military Airlift Wing, 1 June 1980
- 438th Operations Group, 1 November 1991
- 374th Operations Group, 1 October 1993 – 1 September 2003
- 463d Airlift Group, 1 July 2006
- 19th Operations Group, 1 October 2008 – c. 1 September 2015

=== Stations ===
- Presque Isle Army Air Field, Maine, 25 July 1942
- Bluie West One, Greenland, 6 August 1942 – 1 September 1943
- Westover Air Force Base, Massachusetts, 20 July 1952
- McGuire Air Force Base, New Jersey, 16 May 1955 – 25 June 1965
- McGuire Air Force Base, New Jersey, 8 April 1967
- Yokota Air Base, Japan, 1 October 1993 – 1 September 2003
- Cheyenne Air National Guard Base, Wyoming, 1 July 2006 – c. 1 September 2015

=== Aircraft ===
- Douglas C-118 Liftmaster (1952–1965)
- Lockheed C-141 Starlifter (1967–1993)
- McDonnell Douglas C-9 Nightingale (1993–2004)
- Lockheed C-130 Hercules (2006–2015)

=== Awards and campaigns ===
- Meritorious Unit Award: 1 August 2009 – 31 July 2011
- Air Force Outstanding Unit Awards: 8 April 1967 – 30 April 1968; 1 July 1982 – 30 June 1984; 1 October 2000 – 30 September 2002; 1 July 2006 – 30 June 2007
- Republic of Vietnam Gallantry Cross with Palm: 8 April 1967 – 28 January 1973
- World War II European-African-Middle Eastern Theater
- Southwest Asia: Defense of Saudi Arabia; Liberation and Defense of Kuwait.
- Armed Forces Expeditionary Streamers. Panama, 1989–1990
