= Frank E. Welles =

American professor and fraternity founder

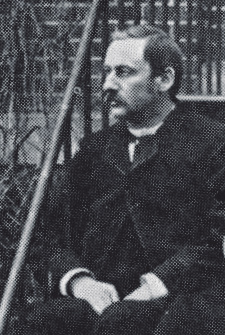
Dr. Frank E. Welles, 1891 Geneseo Normal School Yearbook group photo of faculty, page 61.

Dr. Frank Ephraim Welles (April 1852 - April 13, 1927) was an American professor born in New York State. He was a member of the senior class of the Brockport Normal School where on October 11, 1869 he was a founding member of The Gamma Sigma Society. Welles decided to transfer in 1871, to the newly opened Geneseo State Normal School in Geneseo, NY. While at Geneseo, Frank E. Welles became a founding member of the Delphic Fraternity and was elected its first president.

Welles was part of the first graduating class of students of the Geneseo Normal School in 1872. After graduation, Welles taught at the local high school in Nunda, NY and later became the school's principal. He then eventually became the Superintendent of the Utica City School District in Utica, NY.

Welles received a bachelor's degree from Illinois Wesleyan University in 1886. In 1889, after his work in Utica, Welles accepted a teaching position at the Geneseo Normal School (today SUNY Geneseo.) There he chaired the Department of Classics where he taught Latin and Greek. He then became assistant principal and remained with the Geneseo State Normal School for 23 years. Welles received his master's degree in 1893 from his alma mater Illinois Wesleyan University and his degree of Doctor of Philosophy from Ohio Wesleyan University.

Welles was a leader of the community Presbyterian Church, a member of the National Educational Association, the Livingston County Historical Society, and the Freemasons, holding the title of Grand Master Mason of his local lodge in 1895 and 1896.

After retiring from education in 1922, Dr. Welles became a farmer in Schenectady, NY and died on April 13, 1927, in Great Neck, NY. He was survived by his wife Cornelia and their four children; James, Mary, Colin, and Frank Jr.
