= John M. Milne =

American academic administrator (1850–1905)

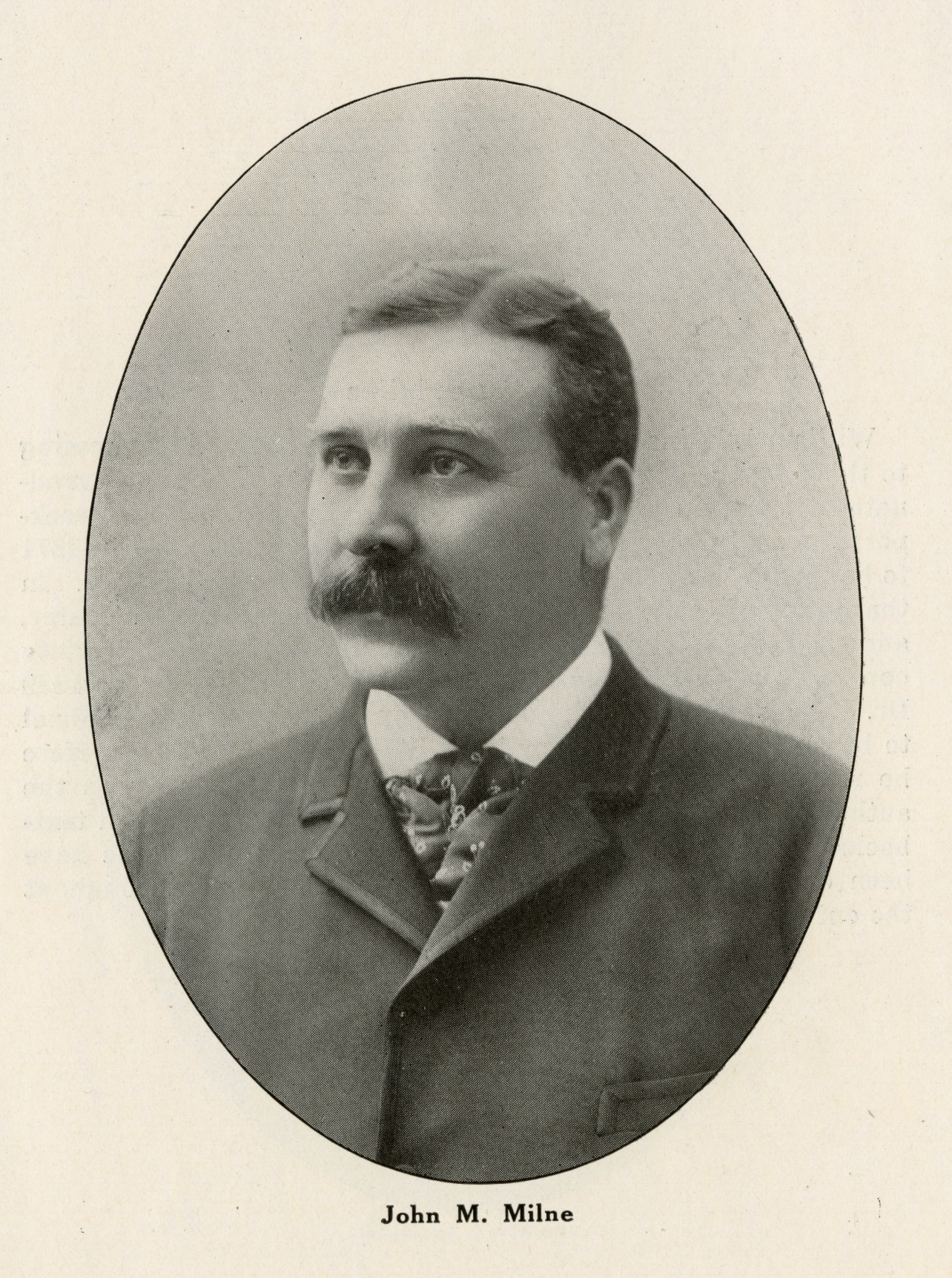
- Photo of John M. Milne.
- Born: March 3, 1850
- Died: February 2, 1905 (aged 54)
- Known for: Academic administrator

John M. Milne (1850-1905) was the second head of the institution that is today the State University of New York at Geneseo.

John Morgan Milne was born on March 3, 1850, near Aberdeen, Scotland. His family came to America and settled near Holley, New York. Milne was a graduate of the Brockport Normal School, which is today the State University of New York at Brockport. While at Brockport, Milne became a founding member of the Gamma Sigma Society. Milne was also elected the first grand president of the fraternity at the 22nd Convocation. John Milne was preceded as head of SUNY Geneseo by his brother, William J. Milne.

After Milne graduated from Brockport in 1871, he studied a year at the University of Rochester. When the Geneseo State Normal School opened, he was elected teacher of Greek and Latin. While carrying on his work as a teacher, he continued his studies at Rochester and received a degree in 1879. He taught at Geneseo until October 1889 when his brother William resigned the principalship, and he was elected to succeed him. In 1890 the degree of Ph.D. was conferred upon John Milne by the University of the State of New York. Because of ill health he gave up his work in 1903. He died on February 2, 1905.

== Sources ==
- 1917 Report on SUNY Brockport
