= Delphic Fraternity =

American multicultural collegiate fraternity

- ΓΣΤ
- Founded: October 13, 1871; 154 years ago SUNY Geneseo
- Type: Social
- Affiliation: Independent
- Former affiliation: NMGC
- Status: Active
- Emphasis: Multicultural
- Scope: Local
- Motto: "Friendship, Fellowship, and Fidelity"
- Slogan: "Unity AmonGST All"
- Colors: Red, White, and Royal blue
- Symbol: Delphic 7
- Flower: White rose and Red dahlia
- Jewel: Ruby
- Mascot: Dragon
- Philanthropy: American Foundation for Suicide Prevention
- Chapters: 2 undergraduate, 3 graduate
- Nickname: Delphics
- Headquarters: New Paltz, New York; United States
- Website: delphicfraternity.net

The Delphic Fraternity, Inc., also known as Delphic of Gamma Sigma Tau (ΓΣΤ), is an American multicultural fraternity. It was originally founded in New York State in 1871 as a literary society and was re-established in 1987 as a multicultural fraternity. It was a founding member of the National Multicultural Greek Council.

== History ==
The Delphic Society was founded on October 13, 1871, at the Geneseo Normal and Training School (SUNY Geneseo) in upstate New York. It was a literary debating society. It was a successor organization to the Delphic Society at Rochester, which had been active until at least December 1866.

Its founders were:

- John Beach Abbott
- Charles W. Barney
- Lewis E. Coe
- John N. Drake
- William S. Janes
- William S. Kershner
- Scott L. McNinch
- James M. Milne
- Loring Olmsted
- Frank E. Welles
- Charles S. Wilbur
- Ara Wilkinson
- Frank A. Winne

With affiliations at other schools, the college literary society at Geneseo became known as the Delphic Fraternity.

Delphic eventually became a regional fraternity with chapters at Oneonta, Jamaica, Cortland, New Paltz, Plattsburgh, and Potsdam, New York, and Mansfield, Pennsylvania. The oldest chapter, at SUNY Cortland, traces its formation back to the Cortland Academy Debating Club in 1842.

By the late 1930s, only the Zeta chapter at the State Teachers College at New Paltz (SUNY New Paltz) remained active. In the early 1950s, the chapter became briefly associated with Sigma Tau Gamma, a larger national fraternity. In 1962, the organization became a legal not-for-profit membership entity by incorporating in the state of New York as the Delphic Fraternity of New Paltz, Inc.

After fifteen years of dormancy, the fraternity was re-established as Delphic of Gamma Sigma Tau at SUNY New Paltz on March 11, 1987. It reformed as a multicultural fraternity. The fraternity recognizes the brothers who reestablished the fraternity as its second set of founders, including:

- Steve Carle
- Jose Carrion
- Gil DeLeon
- Emanuel Egipciaco
- Ventura Lopez
- Michael Rand
- Steve Rappleyea
- Todd Reed
- Eugenio Rodriguez
- Edwin Ruiz
- Jeff Seoul
- Lawrence Troutman

Delphic of Gamma Sigma Tau Fraternity became a founding member of the National Multicultural Greek Council in 1998.

In 2003, the Theta chapter at Binghamton University was founded, becoming the first Delphic chapter established in the 21st century. In 2009, the first Delphic chapter outside of the northeast region was chartered at the University of Virginia. Known as the Kappa chapter of Delphic, this chapter is also the first multicultural fraternity established at UVA.

The Delphic Fraternity, Inc. has chartered fourteen chapters. As of 2026, it has two active undergraduate chapters and three active graduate chapters. Its national philanthropy is the American Foundation for Suicide Prevention.

== Symbols ==
The Delphic Fraternity was named for Delphi, Greece. The fraternity's motto is "Friendship, Fellowship, and Fidelity." Its maxim is "Unity AmonGST All."

Its colors are red, white, and royal blue. The fraternity's flowers are the white rose and the red dahlia. Its jewel is the ruby. Its mascot is the dragon. Its nickname is the Delphics.

== Chapters ==
=== Collegiate chapters ===
In the following list of undergraduate chapters, active chapters are indicated in bold and inactive chapters and institutions are in italics.

Chapter	Charter date and range	Institution	Location	Status	Ref.
Alpha	1871–1938	Geneseo Normal School	Geneseo, New York	Inactive	
Beta	1889–1910	Oneota State Normal School	Oneonta, New York	Inactive	(Note: Chapter formed from the Young Men's Debating Club, established in 1889.) (Note: The chapter were inactive because of low male enrollment at the college.)
Gamma	1897–1918	Jamaica Training School for Teachers	Queens, New York	Inactive	
Delta	1898–1915	Mansfield Normal School	Mansfield, Pennsylvania	Inactive	(Note: Chapter closed when fraternities were banned on campus.)
Epsilon	1899–1917	Cortland Normal School	Cortland, New York	Inactive	(Note: The chapter formed from a local Young Men's Debating Club, which was founded as the Cortland Academy Debating Club in 1842. It went inactive during World War I.)
Zeta Alumni	1899–1951; 1955–1972; March 11, 1987 – 2004	State University of New York at New Paltz	New Paltz, New York	Inactive	(Note: The chapter formed from the merger of two local fraternities: Alpha Pi Nu, established in 1889, and Kappa Delta Alpha, established in 1896.) (Note: In the early 1950s, the chapter withdrew and became the Alpha Rho chapter of Sigma Tau Gamma, only to revert to a local called Sig Tau when a state law banned national fraternities at state universities.)
Eta	1900–1907	Plattsburgh State Normal and Training School	Plattsburgh, New York	Inactive	(Note: Chapter formed from Alpha Kappa Sigma, an independent literary society that was established in 1900.)
Baconian	1906–1933	Potsdam Normal School	Potsdam, New York	Inactive	(Note: Chapter formed from the Roger Baconian Society, established in 1870.)
Theta	2003–2010	Binghamton University	Binghamton, New York	Inactive	
**Kappa**	2009	University of Virginia	Charlottesville, Virginia	Active	
**Lambda**	2015	State University of New York at Delhi	Delhi, New York	Active	

=== Graduate chapters ===
In the following list of graduate chapters, active chapters are indicated in bold and inactive chapters are in italics.

Chapter	Charter date and range	Location	Status	Ref.
**Tau Alpha**	2014	New York City, New York	Active	
**Tau Beta**	2014	Washington, D.C.	Active	
**Tau Gamma**	2019	Charlotte, North Carolina	Active	

== Notable members ==
- John Beach Abbott, New York county judge and a State Democratic Leader
- Heinz Ahlmeyer Jr., Lieutenant in the US Marines who died during the Vietnam War and the namesake of a US Post Office
- Rowland L. Davis, New York Supreme Court justice
- Henry Albert Dickinson, New York State Assembly member
- Alfred Harcourt, founder of the Harcourt Publishing Company
- Louis Jay Heath foreign correspondent for United Press International and an organizer of the American Newspaper Guild
- R. Paul Higgins, physician and president of the board of visitors at the Cortland State Teachers College for 24 years
- Clayton R. Lusk, New York State Senate and Acting Lieutenant Governor of New York
- James M. Milne, first principal of the State University of New York at Oneonta
- William James Milne, president of the New York State Normal School at Albany and principal of the Geneseo Normal and Training School
- Charles T. Saxton, New York State Senate and Lieutenant Governor of New York
- David Eugene Smith, mathematician, educator, and editor considered one of the founders of the field of mathematics education
- Harold G. Strait, namesake of a Pennsylvania state highway
- Frank E. Welles, professor at the Geneseo Normal School

== See also ==
- Cultural interest fraternities and sororities
- List of social fraternities

== Related organizations ==
Five of the founding fathers of the Delphic Society at the Geneseo Normal School were previously members of the Gamma Sigma Society at the Brockport Normal School.
