= Delphic Society =

Literary society at the University of Rochester

- Founded: November 2, 1850; 175 years ago University of Rochester
- Type: Literary
- Affiliation: Independent
- Status: Defunct
- Defunct date: December 1866
- Successor: Delphic Fraternity
- Scope: Local
- Chapters: 1
- Former name: Delphic Literary Society
- Headquarters: Rochester, New York; United States

The Delphic Society, also known as the Delphic Literary Society, was one of the first public literary societies at the University of Rochester which led the way to Greek-letter societies and fraternities at the private university.

== History ==
On November 2, 1850, the Saturday before the opening of the University of Rochester, the Delphic Society was founded. On this day, five students who had transferred from Madison University (Colgate University) gathered to discuss their extracurricular activity at the newly formed university in Rochester, New York. The students were members of the Adelphian Society at Madison and wanted to form a similar student group at Rochester. Before adjourning, they had taken the initial steps toward the formation of the Delphic Literary Society for the "promotion of the literary improvement of its members.” The five founders of the first student society at the University of Rochester were Stephen Haskins Carpenter, Nathaniel Judson Clark, Andrew Longyear Freeman, John Buttrick Jones, and Franklin Smith Lyon.

On Friday evening, May 9, 1851, the Delphic Literary Society held its first public exercises. The group later became known as the Delphic Society.

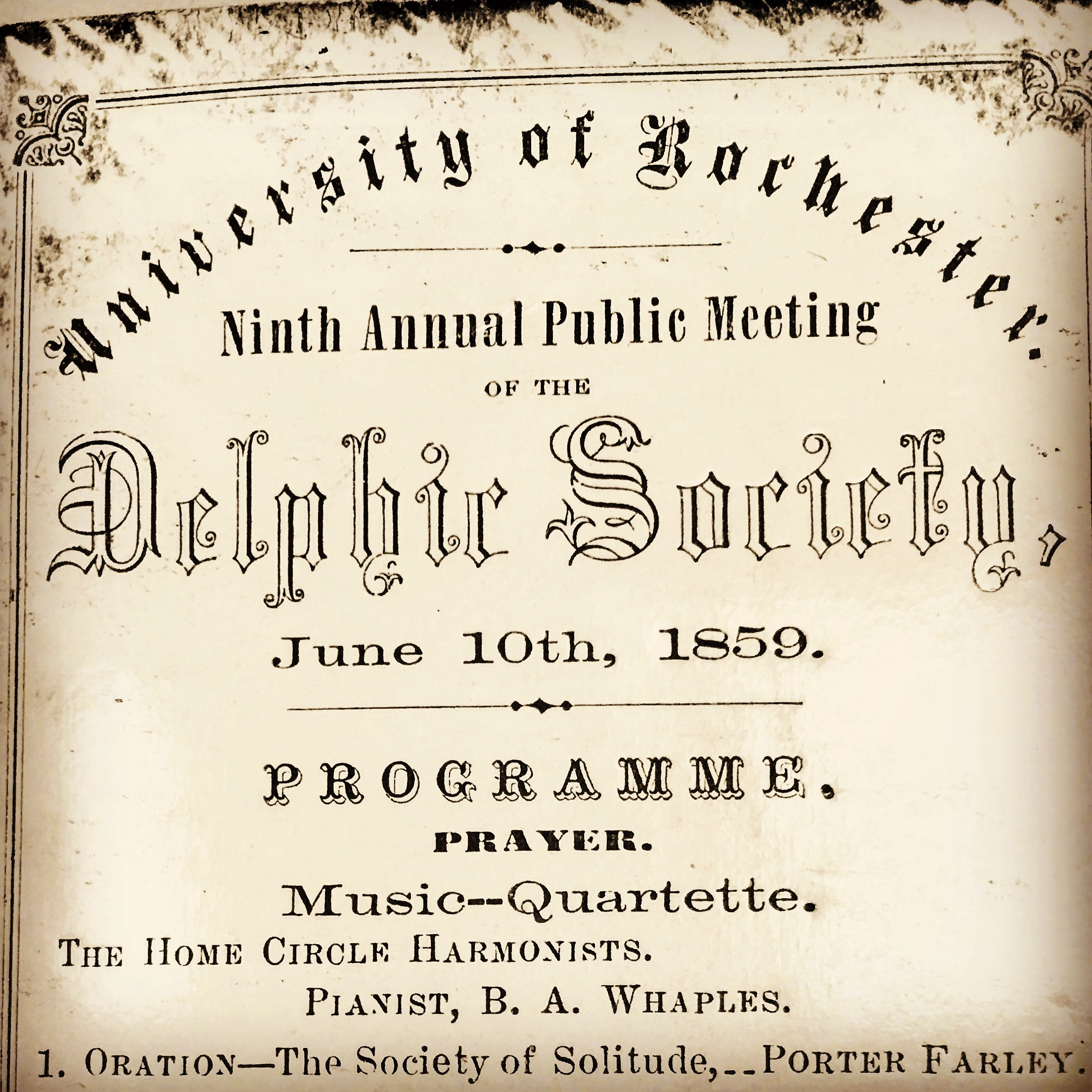
The Delphic Literary Society at the University of Rochester was founded in 1850.

There were two societies at Rochester, Delphic, and Pithonian, which fostered debates and other activities aimed at increasing their members' writing and public speaking skills. Almost all undergraduates belonged to one of the groups. Professors, some trustees, and interested townsmen affiliated with honorary membership. The Delphic Society at Rochester was formed to serve "Wisdom and Reason."

The college literary societies of this period have sometimes been compared to our modern collegiate social fraternities, and, indeed, the competition for new members of rival societies like the Delphic and Pithonian was in some respects comparable to present-day rushing practices. But there was at least this difference between the literary societies and modern fraternities: the membership of the literary societies comprised nearly the whole student body, except for those few who had no interest in belonging to a literary society.

The nemesis of the societies at Rochester was the social fraternity. Five of them, the “old nationals” as they were called, came into existence in the first decade of University life. Due to the drop in enrollment and to the competition of the secret fraternities, which were exclusive, smaller, and afforded more social enjoyment, the Delphic and Pithonian societies ceased to exist soon after the American Civil War. The Delphic Society at the University of Rochester existed on the campus through December 1866.

On October 13, 1871, the Delphic Society at Geneseo, New York, a successor organization to the Delphic Society at Rochester, was founded and continues to exist as the Delphic Fraternity.

== See also ==
- Literary societies
- College literary societies
- List of college literary societies
