= Phi Kappa Literary Society =

Student group at the University of Georgia

- ΦΚ
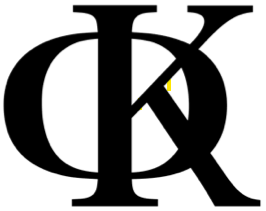
- Founded: February 12, 1820; 206 years ago University of Georgia
- Type: Literary
- Affiliation: Independent
- Status: Active
- Scope: Local
- Publication: The Orator
- Chapters: 1
- Headquarters: Phi Kappa Hall, University of Georgia; Athens, Georgia 30602; United States
- Website: www.phikappauga.org

The Phi Kappa Literary Society is a college literary society, located at the University of Georgia in Athens, Georgia, and is one of the few active literary societies left in America. Originally founded in 1820, the society has disbanded several times and was and most recently refounded in 1991, remaining active since. It continues to hold regular meetings at Phi Kappa Hall on the University of Georgia's North Campus. The Phi Kappa Literary Society holds formal debates and a forum for creative writings and orations as well as poetry.

== History ==
=== Formation ===
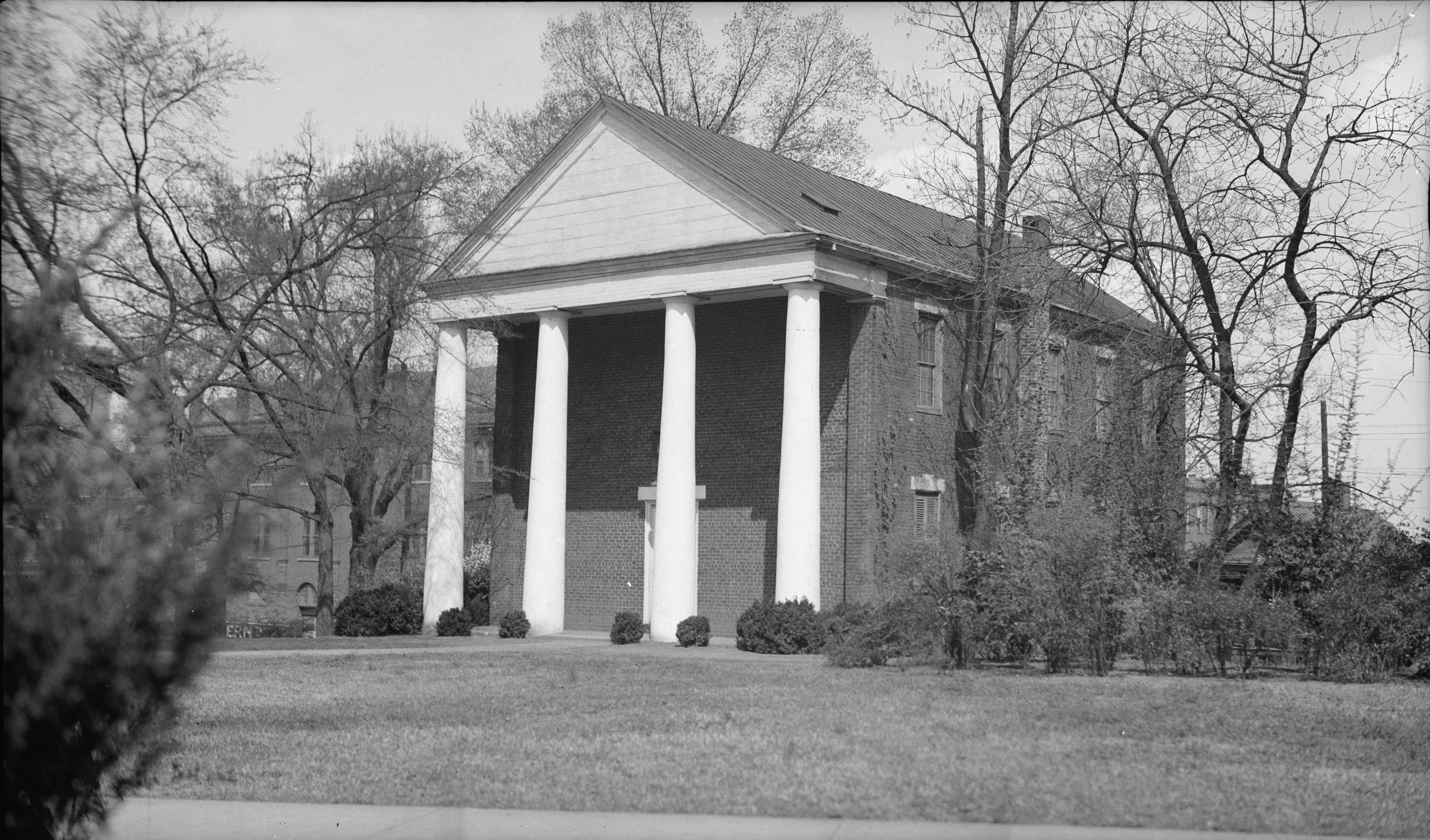
Phi Kappa Hall, c. 1933

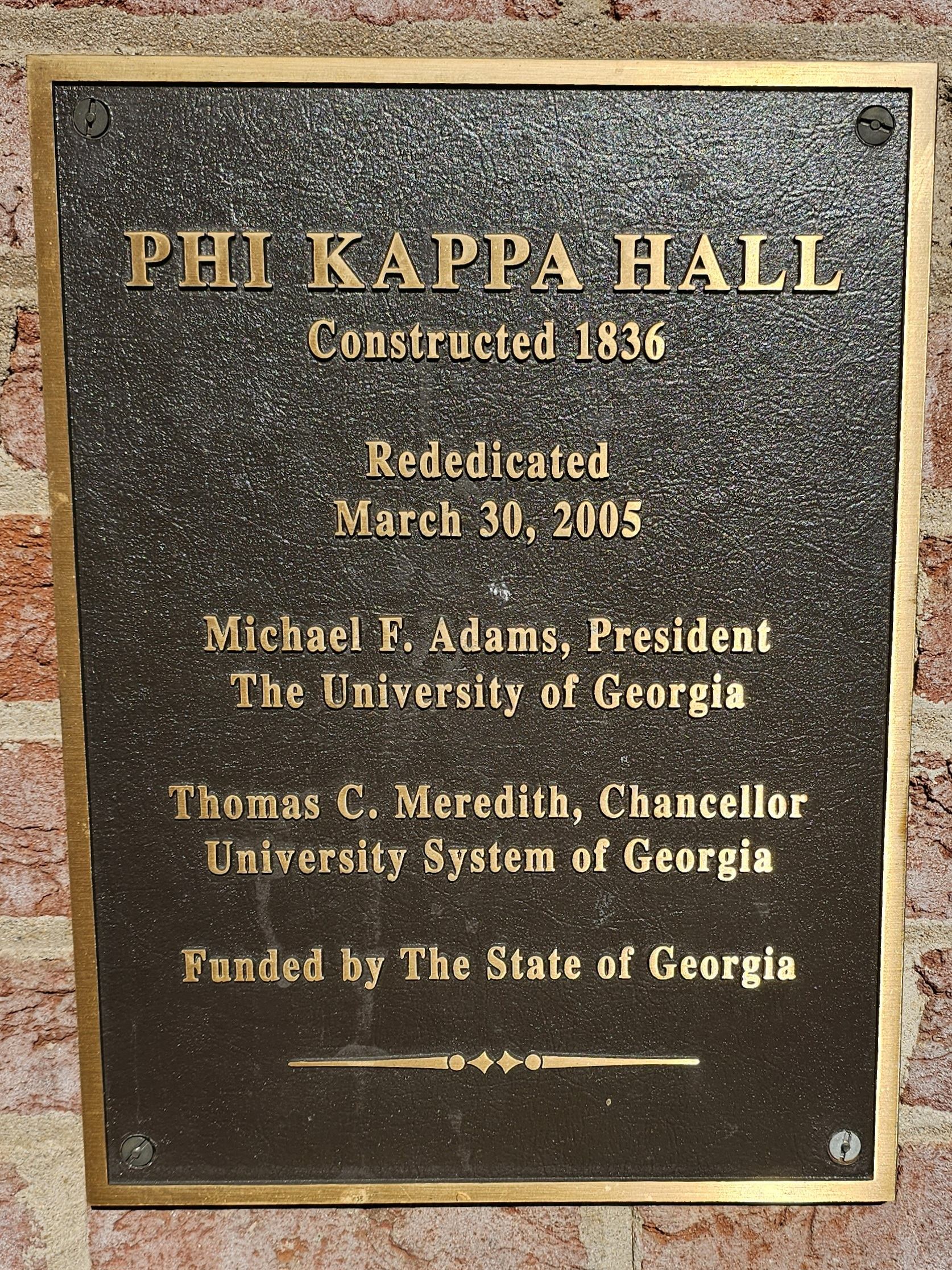
Plaque affixed to the front of Phi Kappa Hall

Phi Kappa Literary Society was founded by Joseph Henry Lumpkin, William Crabbe, Homer V. Howard, Stern Simmons, John G. Rutherford, and John D. Watkins at the University of Georgia on February 12, 1820. They formed the society after splitting from the Demosthenian Literary Society, dissatisfied with their disorderly conduct.

As Phi Kappa grew larger, makeshift meeting places were no longer appropriate or useful. Through funding provided by member Alexander Stephens, the Phi Kappa Literary Society moved into its permanent residence at Phi Kappa Hall. Phi Kappa Hall was built for $5,000 and dedicated on July 5, 1836. It is the seventh-oldest building on the University of Georgia's campus, and the Phi Kappa Literary Society currently shares use of the building with the Georgia Debate Union.

=== Disbanding and refounding ===
The Phi Kappa Literary Society has disbanded and reformed many times in its history. The first occurrence was in 1863 due to student enlistment in the American Civil War, which left only five members remaining. Meetings resumed on January 5, 1866. The society flourished in the early 1900s, participating in numerous collegiate debate competitions as well as sending members to compete in international collegiate debate contests. However, a drop in student enrollment due to World War II caused the society to disband again in 1944, and an extremely polarized atmosphere in the society and the university as a whole pulled the Phi Kappa Literary Society apart, seemingly for the final time, in 1973.

After sporadic, unsuccessful attempts to revive Phi Kappa, in 1991, Stephanie Hendricks took an interest in the society after prompting from Thomas Peter Allen and was inducted as its new president on January 31, 1991, by former 1961 Phi Kappa President E.H. Culpepper. Thirteen new members were inducted shortly thereafter, and the first meeting of the newly refounded society took place on February 14, 1991, in Phi Kappa Hall.

== Symbols and traditions ==
The society publishes The Orator, a literary magazine.

== Membership ==
To become a member of the Phi Kappa Literary Society, a University of Georgia student must petition the society for membership, which is a five-week process that culminates in the student delivering a petitioning speech before the society. The student must then be accepted by a vote of the society. Once a student is a full member of Phi Kappa, they must speak at least once every three weeks to maintain membership.

== Activities ==
=== Weekly debates ===
Each academic Thursday, Phi Kappa holds a pre-planned debate centered around a resolution in the format of "Be It Hereby Resolved." Two pre-selected speakers start off the debate with one speech in affirmation of the resolution and one in the negation. These speakers have seven minutes to attempt to deliver their speech while all subsequent speakers are limited to five minutes each. The president facilitates the debate, calling on each new speaker until the society is ready to vote. A majority vote of the society decides the winner of each debate. The society abides by Robert's Rules of Order for their meeting procedures.

=== Creative writings and orations ===
The weekly main debate is followed by an open forum for creative writings and orations. In this section of the meeting, both members and guests can deliver any creative writings they may wish to share, pre-prepared speeches outside of the realms of debate, or extemporaneous speeches.

=== Intrasociety Debate ===
Each fall, Phi Kappa holds an Intrasociety Debate between active members and alumni. Active members and alumni form teams of five and prepare a debate based on a resolution, with about a month of preparation time. The resolution is chosen in alternating years by actives or alumni. One team speaks in affirmation of the resolution, and one team speaks in negation of it. The debate is separated into three parts: constructive, rebuttal, and summation. Upon conclusion of the debate, a panel of judges (also made up of active and alumni members) select the winner.

=== Intersociety Debate ===
Traditionally, each spring, a competitive debate is held between Phi Kappa and their rival society, Demosthenian. This long-standing debate has roots reaching back at least to the 1920s when it was known as the "Champion Debate." In the modern era, this debate takes a similar form as the Intrasociety Debate, with a team of five debaters from each society arguing for or against an agreed upon resolution. Each team provides alternating constructive, rebuttal, and summation arguments, and the winning team is determined by evaluation from a panel of judges, who are usually university faculty members.

=== Phi Kappa Declamation ===
In the spring, Phi Kappa holds the Phi Kappa Declamation, wherein members aim to give a speech from a list of pre-selected topics.

The Declamation was first introduced in 1994, shortly after the refounding of Phi Kappa. It was previously known as the Alexander Stephens Declamation until Phi Kappa members voted to rename the event in 2019.

=== Campus involvement ===
The Phi Kappa Literary Society often collaborates with other on-campus and off-campus groups to hold special events. In 2011, members of Phi Kappa participated in a debate versus the renowned Oxford Union, and in 2013, Phi Kappa sponsored a debate between the Communist Party USA and the Libertarian Party of Georgia. The Phi Kappa Literary Society also maintains a close relationship with The Dialectic and Philanthropic Societies at UNC-Chapel Hill. Their closest tie to another student organization is their 202-year-long rivalry with the Demosthenian Literary Society. Until 2019, each spring semester Phi Kappa would debate the rival society in the Intersociety Debate. However, in November 2019 the societies revised their intersociety agreement and eliminated the Intersociety Debate. Phi Kappa instead debated Georgetown's Philodemic Society in 2021 before renegotiating the intersociety agreement with Demosthenian and reinstituting the Intersociety Debate in 2022. In early 2026, relations with the Demosthenians were severed once again. Besides this competitive debate, the societies continue to meet for a non-competitive Intersociety Meeting each fall.

== Notable members ==
- Morris B. Abram, US Ambassador to United Nations, Founder of UN Watch
- Augustus O. Bacon, US Senator from Georgia, President pro tempore of the United States Senate
- Francis S. Bartow, Confederate Congressman, Confederate General
- Henry L. Benning, Confederate General, eponym of Fort Benning
- Eugene Robert Black, Chairman of the Federal Reserve
- Howell Cobb, Speaker of the US House of Representatives, US Secretary of the Treasury, President of the Confederate States Provincial Congress
- Thomas Reade Rootes Cobb, Confederate General; editor of the first Georgia Code
- Norman S. Fletcher, Chief Justice of the Supreme Court of Georgia
- Henry W. Grady, Editor of the Atlanta Constitution; voice of the "New South" Movement
- Phil Gramm, US Senator from Texas
- Thomas W. Hardwick, US Senator from Georgia, Governor of Georgia, US Representative from Georgia
- Nathaniel Harris, Governor of Georgia, founder of Georgia Institute of Technology
- Clark Howell, Pulitzer Prize-winning editor of the Atlanta Constitution; founder of WGST 920 AM radio station
- Herschel V. Johnson, Governor of Georgia, 1860 Democratic Party vice-presidential nominee
- Robert Lipshutz, White House Counsel to the Jimmy Carter administration
- Joseph Henry Lumpkin, First Chief Justice of the Supreme Court of Georgia, co-founder of the University of Georgia School of Law
- Sam Massell, Mayor of Atlanta
- Joseph Rucker Lamar, U.S. Supreme Court Justice
- Richard B. Russell Jr., US Senator from Georgia, Governor of Georgia, President pro tempore of the United States Senate
- Richard B. Russell Sr., Chief Justice of the Supreme Court of Georgia, Chief Justice of the Georgia Court of Appeals
- Carl Sanders, Governor of Georgia
- Alexander Stephens, vice-president of the Confederate States of America, US Representative from Georgia
- Eugene Talmadge, Governor of Georgia
- William Tate, Dean of Men of the University of Georgia
- Ernest Vandiver, Governor of Georgia, Lt. Governor of Georgia, Georgia Adjutant General

== Other historic societies ==
- The Demosthenian Literary Society of The University of Georgia
- The Dialectic and Philanthropic Societies of the University of North Carolina at Chapel Hill
- The Philomathean Society of the University of Pennsylvania
- The Philolexian Society of Columbia University
- The Philodemic Society of Georgetown University
- The Washington Literary Society and Debating Union and Jefferson Literary and Debating Society of the University of Virginia
- The Union-Philanthropic (Literary) Society of Hampden–Sydney College
- The American Whig–Cliosophic Society of Princeton University
