= Demosthenian Literary Society =

Literary society at the University of Georgia, US

- Founded: February 19, 1803; 223 years ago University of Georgia
- Type: Literary
- Affiliation: Independent
- Status: Active
- Scope: Local
- Patron saint: Saint Blaise
- Chapters: 1
- Headquarters: University of Georgia, Demosthenian Hall; Athens, Georgia 30602; United States; 33.9569°N 83.3752°W
- Website: www.dlsuga.com

The Demosthenian Literary Society is a debate society at the University of Georgia in Athens, Georgia. It is among the oldest literary societies in the English-speaking world, being the oldest, continuous literary society in North America, and was founded on February 19, 1803, by the first graduating class of the university's Franklin College. The object of the society is "to promote the cause of science and truth by the cultivation of oratory and the art of debate at weekly meetings." It is named after the Greek orator Demosthenes.

The society meets every week during the academic school year in Demosthenian Hall on UGA's North Campus. In addition to its relations with other organizations at the University of Georgia, like the Phi Kappa Literary Society, the society maintains relationships with other Literary and Debate societies across the United States, including the Philodemic Society at Georgetown University, the Dialectic and Philanthropic Societies at UNC-Chapel Hill and the Philolexian Society at Columbia University.

== History ==
Augustin Clayton, James Jackson, and Williams Rutherford are recognized as the founding fathers of Demosthenian. Clayton became the first student to receive his diploma from Franklin College and went on to become a federal judge and a U.S. Representative from Georgia, with Georgia's Clayton County being named in his honor. Rutherford and Jackson went on to become professors at Franklin College.

After 167 years of male-only membership, the first female members of the society were inducted on March 4, 1970. President Sherrill Watkins presided over the initiation of Kathy Conrad, a freshman from Atlanta, and Bebe Herring, a junior from Athens. By the late 1970s, female members were heavily active in the society and held numerous offices—even the President. Today, the society has slightly more female than male members.

Citing issues of student disenfranchisement within the UGA and U.S. political systems, the society voted in 2012 to secede from the United States of America as the micronation 'Demosthenia.' This resolution was acknowledged as a move to raise the society's profile and to encourage lively debate.

In the wake of the Unite the Right rally in Charlottesville, Virginia in August 2017, the society removed their portrait of Confederate general and honorary member Robert E. Lee from their building. The debate attracted significant media attention, with various newspapers such as the Red and Black appearing for the debate. The motion was passed by a unanimous vote of 27–0.

== Demosthenian Hall ==
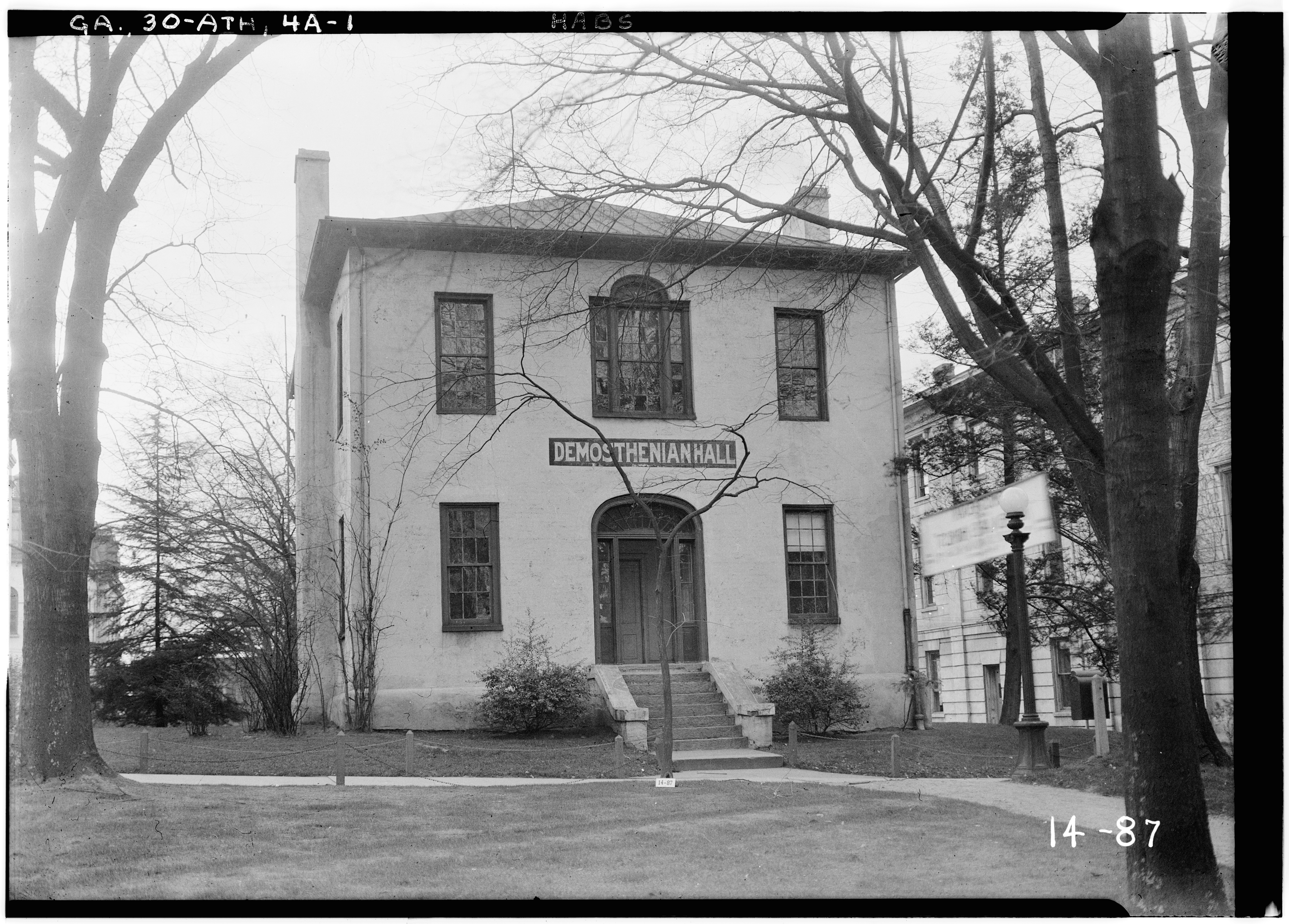
Demosthenian Hall, circa 1934

Demosthenian Hall was constructed by Dr. James Tinsley in 1824. It is the fourth oldest building at the University of Georgia and was placed on the National Register for Historic Places in 1971. The construction was financed by the society's members, alumni, and friends. It remains the only building on the UGA campus that was privately financed and is not wholly owned by the university.

In 1997, Demosthenian Hall received $200,000 in donations to restore the hall. The construction work restored the ceiling medallion and the rest of the Upper Chamber to its original 1824 layout and color scheme. The original hardwood floors were uncovered and restored in the Lower Chamber.

=== The Upper Chamber ===
The Upper Chamber is the meeting room of the society. The speaker's lectern has been dated to the 1820s and may have been built specifically for the Hall. The simplicity of the carved mantels, window moldings, doors, and deep paneled wainscoting emphasizes the drama of the ornate plasterwork ceiling medallion, which is based on a template designed by Asher Benjamin. It is a medallion of holly leaves surrounded by swags of smaller leaves, which are framed by delicate filigree. This ceiling is one of the most architecturally unique structures at the University of Georgia and is one of the few remaining examples of this form of decorative artwork.

=== The Lower Chamber ===
The Lower Chamber is in one main room, flanked on the right by two smaller rooms - designated the President's Office and the Library. Containing mostly donated furniture constructed in the late 18th and early 19th century, the society has endeavored to maintain the historic feel of the rooms.

=== The Library ===
The society has maintained an extensive library since its founding and currently owns over 2,000 volumes. Its collection surpassed that of the university's main library for the majority of the 19th century. Upon the reopening of the university after the Civil War, the society donated its books to the university to replace the library collection that had been burned. Demosthenian maintains extensive archives of past meeting minutes, society business, and members. In addition, the most recent minutes and some historical minutes from 1829 are available online.

== Organization ==
=== Meetings ===
The Demosthenian Literary Society was founded for the specific purpose of promoting the art of extemporaneous speech. During meetings, members introduce original resolutions that have not been shared with others before their presentation. This method of debate challenges members and guests to formulate speeches based solely on prior knowledge and without extensive preparation. Speakers are also subject to questions from the audience and are limited to speeches of up to five minutes in length. Each meeting of the Demosthenian Literary Society is run by Parliamentary Procedure as set out in Robert's Rules of Order.

=== Officers ===
After being active members for a designated amount of time and completing adequate service to the society, members are eligible to run for officer positions. The society has 13 officers: President, Vice President, Secretary, Chief Justice, two Associate Justices, Treasurer, Hall Administrator, Hall Preservationist, Historian, Sergeant-at-Arms, Librarian, and Custodian. The offices of Treasurer, Hall Administrator, Hall Preservationist, and Historian are all year-long positions elected every Spring, while the others are elected each semester.

== Activities ==
=== All Night Meeting ===
On the Saturday that falls closest to the anniversary of the society's founding, the All Night Meeting is hosted at Demosthenian Hall. The All Night Meeting lasts twelve hours, from 7 pm Saturday to 7 am Sunday. Dinner is served, and then the meeting opens with guest keynote speakers; the meeting then continues with debate among current members, guests, and alumni of the society throughout the night and into the morning. Each year at the All Night Meeting, current members are recognized for their service and devotion to the society by being awarded Speaker's Keys.

=== Intersociety debate ===
Each spring, the Demosthenian and the Phi Kappa Literary Societies hold a debate to highlight the oratory skills of the societies' best speakers. Due to a change in relations between the two societies, the 2020 Intersociety Debate would have been held between the Demosthenian Literary Society and the Georgia Debate Union until COVID-19 suspended the society's operations. The Debate is usually held in the Hatton-Lovejoy courtroom at the University of Georgia School of Law. Judges are randomly selected for the debate from a pool of nominations submitted by members of both societies.

Annual Intersociety Debate Results
Date	Resolution (Be it Resolved:)	Winner (position)	Notes
2026			Debate not held
2025	The United States should ban jury trials in criminal cases to further justice.	Phi Kappa (Affirmative)	
2024			Debate not held
2023	American education institutions should do away with standardized testing for the purpose of K-12 assessment and undergraduate admission.	Phi Kappa (Negative)	
2022	The establishment of private property on celestial bodies should be established via first possession.	Phi Kappa (Negative)	Debate held in the Miller Learning Center
2021			Debate not held due to COVID-19 pandemic.
2020			Debate not held due to COVID-19 pandemic.
2019	Technology companies should release user data to the United States government in criminal cases.	Phi Kappa (Affirmative)	
2018	Globalization is a net detriment to the developing world.	Demosthenian (Negative)	
2017	The continued usage of U.S. agricultural subsidies is irresponsible.	Demosthenian (Affirmative)	
2016	The XXIV Olympic Winter Games in Beijing shall be the last Olympic Games.	Demosthenian (Affirmative)	
2015	The University of Georgia should institute a test-optional policy for admitting undergraduate students.	Phi Kappa (Affirmative)	
2014	The development of artificial intelligence greater than or equal to human intelligence would be detrimental to mankind.	Demosthenian (Affirmative)	Debate held at the Larry Walker Room in Rusk Hall.
2013	The United States is obligated to interfere in the domestic affairs of other nations when human rights are violated as defined by the International Committee of the Red Cross.	Demosthenian (Negative)	
2012	The United States should privatize its national ocean waters.	Demosthenian (Affirmative)	
2011	Global nuclear disarmament would be detrimental to U.S. national security.	Demosthenian (Negative)	
2010	The management of natural resources by foreign corporations in lesser developed countries is beneficial to those countries.	Phi Kappa (Negative)	
2009	Supreme Court justices should be chosen by popular election	Demosthenian (Negative)	
2008	In the interest of national security, the United States ought to permit warrantless surveillance for communications going into or out of the country.	Demosthenian (Negative)	Debate held in the Miller Learning Center
2007	The United States Constitution ought to be amended to limit the number of terms a member of congress can serve in his or her lifetime.	Phi Kappa (Affirmative)	Debate held at the Athens-Clarke County Courthouse
2006	The United States should increase significantly its use of nuclear power to generate energy.	Phi Kappa (Affirmative)	
2005	The United States should ratify the statute of the International Criminal Court.	Phi Kappa (Affirmative)	
2004	Limitations based on country of origin are an ethical means to restrict immigration into the United States.	Phi Kappa (Negative)	
2003	A direct democracy is better than a representative democracy.	Demosthenian (Negative)	
2002	The teaching of a consensus history is necessary for preserving American identity.	Demosthenian (Affirmative)	
2001	A citizen's right to vote does not carry with it the duty to vote.	Demosthenian (Negative)	
2000	Artistic achievement, not multicultural representation, should guide the formation of the American Literary Canon.	Demosthenian (Negative)	
1999	America was safer during the Cold War.	Phi Kappa (Affirmative)	
1998	–	–	Debate not held due to break in relationship between societies
1997	The international community should practice a policy of sustainable development to combat the environmental crisis.	Demosthenian (Unavailable)	
1996	When in conflict, the rights of the individual outweigh the interests of the community.	Phi Kappa	
1995		Phi Kappa	
1994	Manned space flight is counter to the scientific interests of the United States.	N/A	Debate was not held. Phi Kappa rejected the official debate challenge due to a dispute over the topic.
1993	(Unavailable)	Phi Kappa (Unavailable)	
1992	Which has been more beneficial to mankind, science or religion?	Demosthenian (Religion)	
1991	The United States is entering a decline, instead of a Renaissance. (paraphrased, exact wording unavailable)	Demosthenian (Unavailable)	First modern intersociety debate following the refounding of Phi Kappa

== Notable members ==
- Rachel Aaron, fantasy and science fiction author
- William Yates Atkinson, Governor of Georgia
- John Barrow, U.S. Congressman
- Pope Barrow, U.S. Senator
- Robert Benham, first African-American chief justice, Georgia Supreme Court
- William Tapley Bennett Jr., diplomat
- D. W. Brooks, founder of Gold Kist
- John A. Campbell, U.S. Supreme Court Justice
- William Ragsdale Cannon, American United Methodist bishop
- Augustin Clayton, Statesman, Judge, U.S. Congressman from Georgia
- Hugh M. Dorsey, Governor of Georgia
- Tim Echols, Georgia Public Service Commissioner
- Joel Furr, the first person to refer to junk e-mail as "spam"
- Benjamin Harvey Hill, U.S. and Confederate States Senator
- Phil Kent, political consultant
- Jack Kingston, U.S. Congressman
- Crawford Long, physician, best known for the first use of inhaled sulfuric ether as an anesthetic, first obstetric anesthetist
- Eugene Patterson- civil Rights activist, Pulitzer Prize-winning author, and publisher of the Pentagon Papers
- Count Emilio Pucci, fashion designer
- Ralph Reed, political consultant
- Charles Henry Smith, better known as writer Bill Arp
- Herman E. Talmadge, U.S. Senator and former governor of Georgia
- Robert Toombs, first Secretary of State of the Confederate States of America, U.S. Senator and Congressman
- Beth Shapiro, Rhodes Scholar and recipient of a MacArthur Foundation "Genius Grant"
- Emory Speer, post-civil war equal rights advocate and federal judge
- A.E. Stallings, poet & translator (recipient of a MacArthur Foundation "Genius Grant")
- Bob Trammell, former Minority Leader of the Georgia House of Representatives
