= Jefferson Hall (University of Virginia) =

Building in Charlottesville, Virginia, US

Coordinates: 38.035251°N 78.505036°W

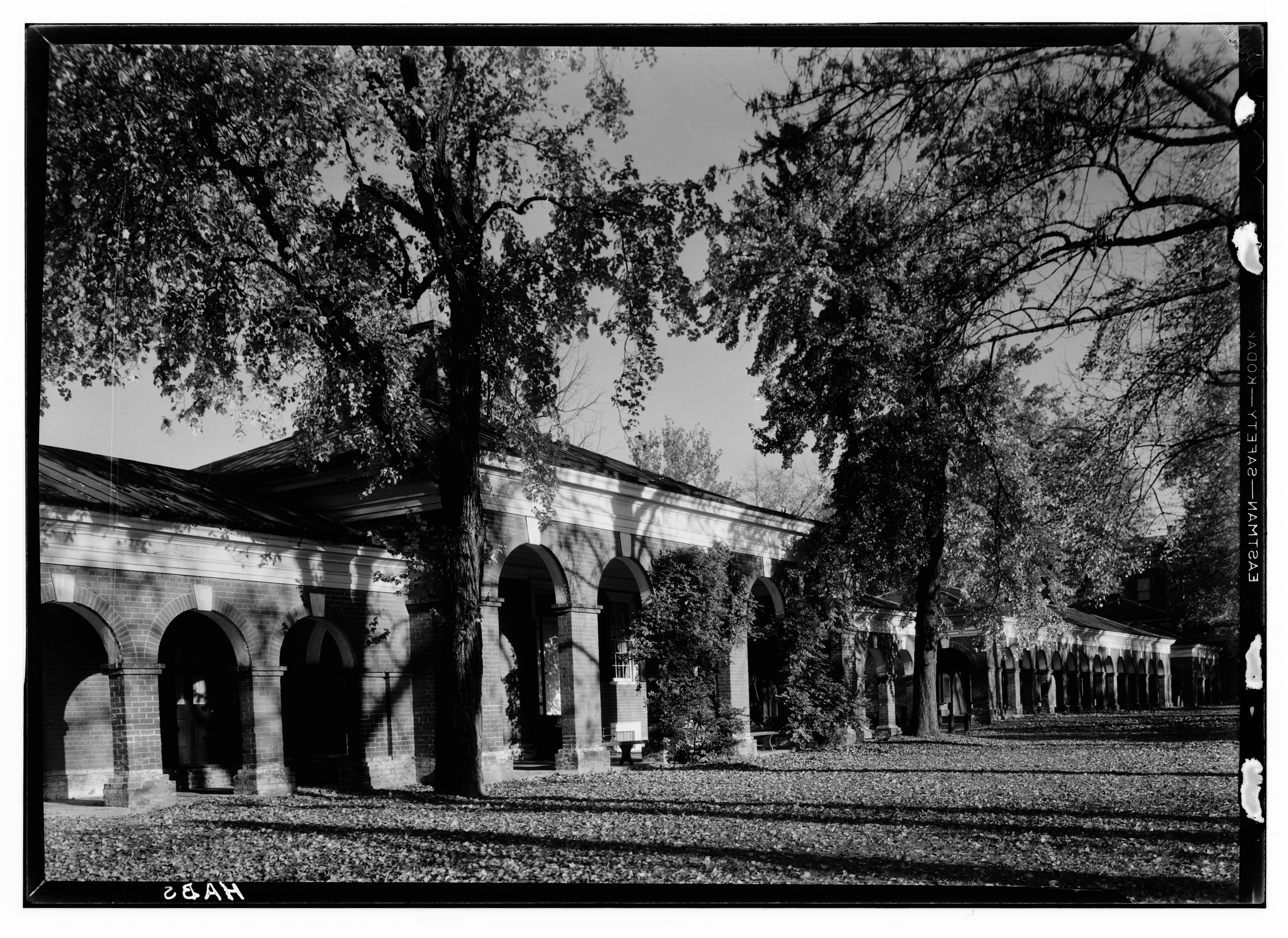
Jefferson Hall, University of Virginia, c. 1933

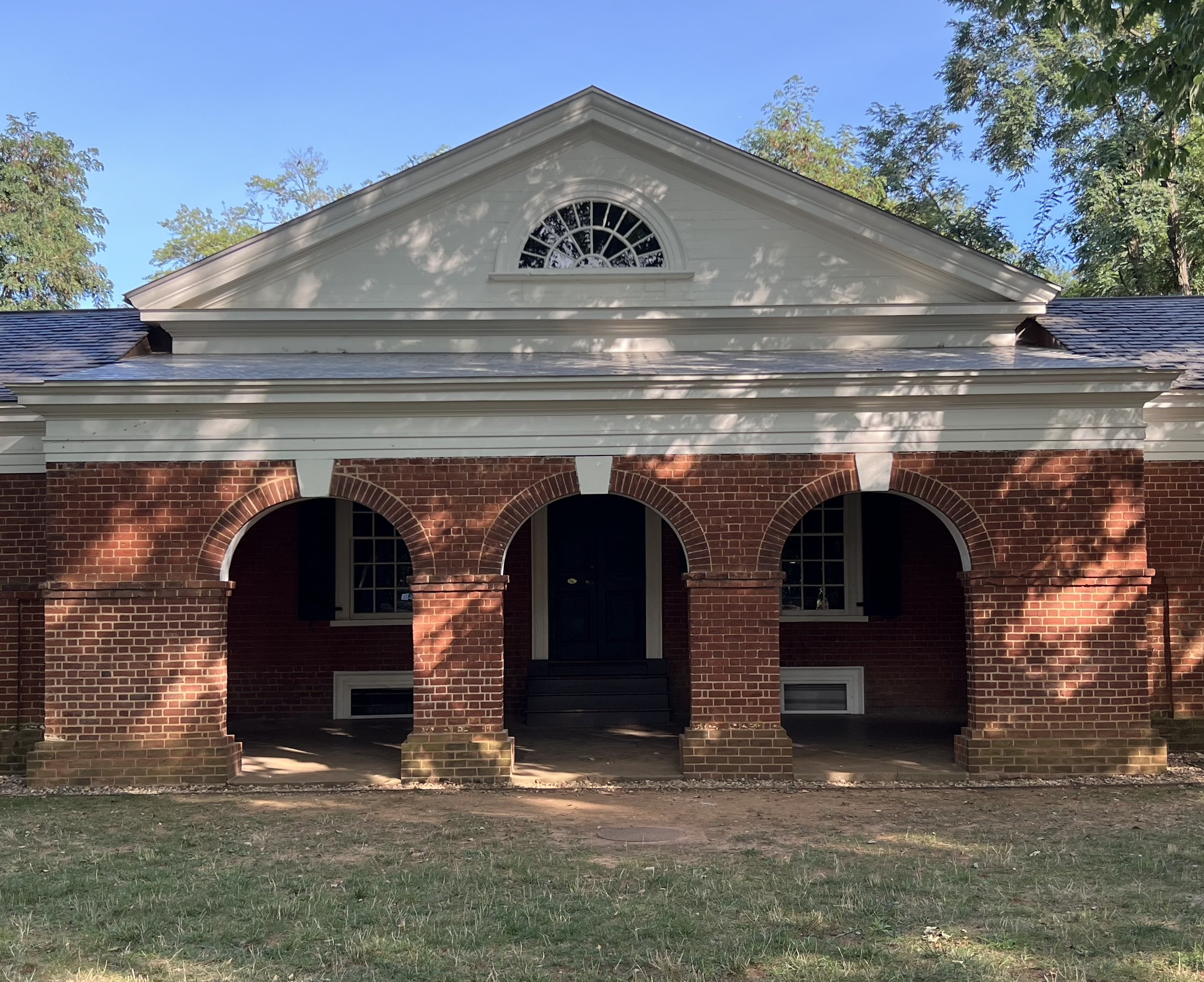
Jefferson Hall, University of Virginia, September 8, 2024

Jefferson Hall – more formally known as "Hotel C" of Thomas Jefferson's original "Academical Village" – is a building on the West Range of the University of Virginia. It is the traditional home of the Jefferson Literary and Debating Society. The term "Jefferson Hall" (commonly referred to as "Jeff Hall" or "The Hall") is often used for the building.

== Architectural heritage and historic preservation ==
The Academical Village designed by Thomas Jefferson between 1817 and 1826 serves as the heart and historic core of the University of Virginia. In 1970, it was included on the National Register of Historic Places. In 1987, it was inscribed by UNESCO as a World Heritage Site.

"In the words of Harvard scholar George Ticknor, in a letter to a fellow historian in December of 1874, '[The University] is a mass of buildings more beautiful than anything architectural in New England and more appropriate to [any] university that can be found, perhaps, in the world.' "

Hotel C is one of six original "hotels" created by Jefferson when laying out the plans for the Academical Village. These hotels originally served as student dining facilities. When not boarding students, various student organizations made use of the building as meeting space.

In 1837, the university's Board of Visitors granted the Jefferson Society control of the largest room in the building and, in 1841, further gave the group permission to remove the walls partitioning the main level of Hotel C, leaving that floor as one large room.

Jefferson Hall underwent major restoration and renovation in summer 2006.

== Use and occupancy ==
The Patrick Henry Society originally met in Hotel C until the group's dissolution in 1830. The Jefferson Society was actually founded by 16 students who broke away from the Patrick Henry Society on July 14, 1825.

The Washington Literary Society and Debating Union met in Jefferson Hall from its founding in 1835 until 1837, at which point it moved to Pavilion VII on the Lawn and, from there, to hotels on the East Range. The current incarnation of the Washington Society now meets in Hotel C on Thursday evenings.

The Jefferson Society, which held its initial meeting in Room Seven, West Lawn, thereafter regularly meet in various Pavilions on the Lawn, particularly Pavilion I and Pavilion IV. Its regular meetings in Jefferson Hall began in 1837, following the move of the Washington Society to Pavilion VII. Hotel C has consistently served as the home of the Jefferson Society from that time through the present day, save several brief interruptions primarily during the American Civil War (1861–1865) and various restoration efforts.

The Confederate States of America used Jefferson Hall as part of the Charlottesville General Hospital during the Civil War. Along with student volunteers, both enslaved and free African-Americans labored in the hospital, where a number of free African-American women even worked as paid nurses.

Today, in addition to the Jefferson and Washington Societies, a wide range of student, faculty, and community groups, including the International Relations Organization, use Jefferson Hall.

== Artwork (selected) ==
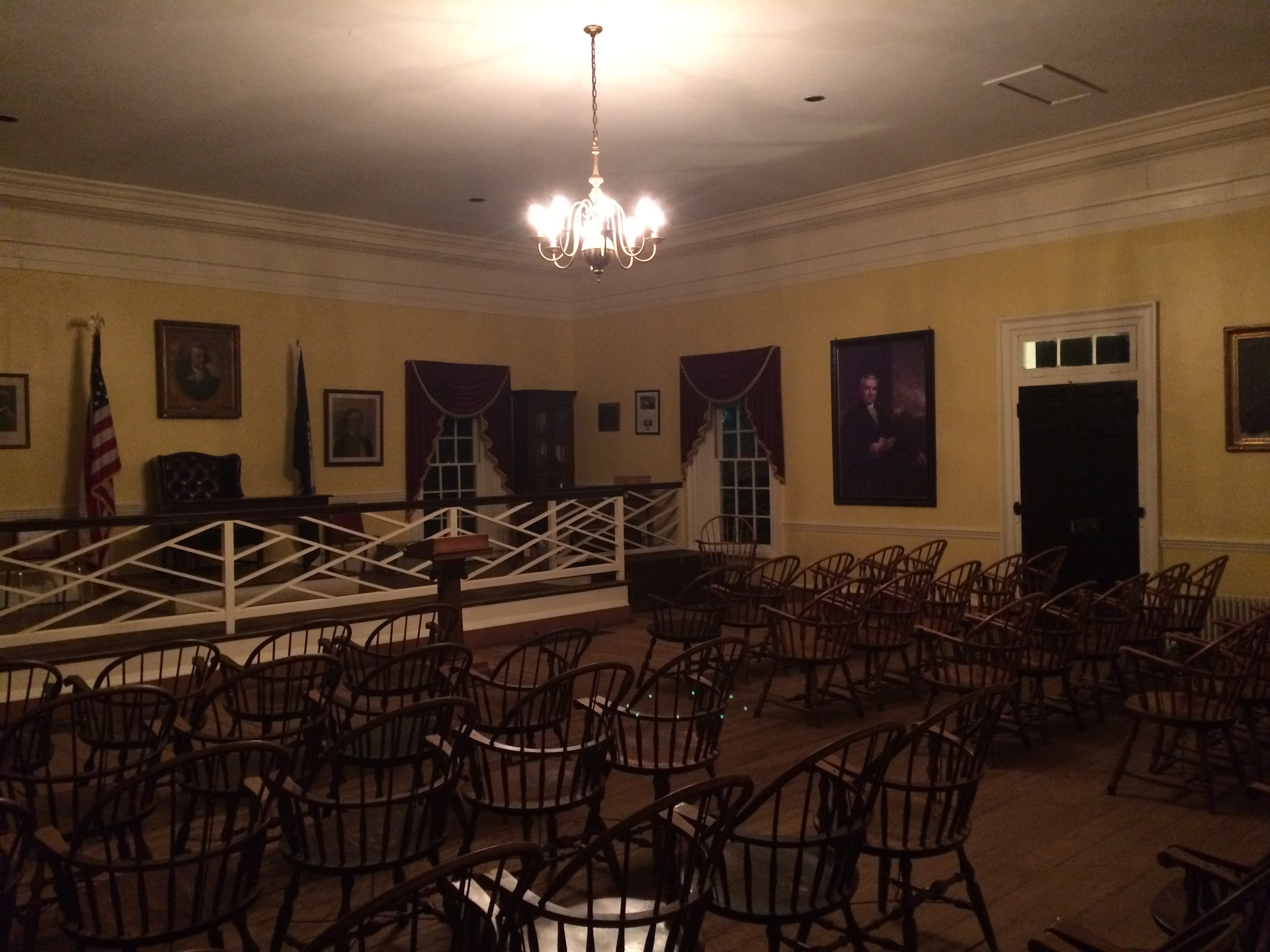
Jefferson Hall (interior), West Range, University of Virginia, December 5, 2015

Various hand-painted and photo portraits are on exhibition in Jefferson Hall, including:

- a hand-painted portrait of James Madison,
- a hand-painted portrait of James Monroe,
- a photo portrait of Edgar Allan Poe,
- a photo portrait of Woodrow Wilson,
- a hand-painted portrait of Barbara M.G. Lynn, and
- a hand-painted portrait of Wesley L. Harris.

"From approximately 1860 until 1920, [a hand-painted portrait of Thomas Jefferson by Thomas Sully (1819)] hung in Jefferson Hall until, as Howard and Gallogly write, 'President Alderman [took] the portrait after finding it unattended while the doors to Jefferson Hall stood wide open.' Valued at $600,000 today, it hangs in the Upper West Oval Room of the Rotunda." The Sully Portrait is presently on loan to the University of Virginia from the Jefferson Literary and Debating Society.
