= St. Johns' College (Arkansas) =

Former college in Little Rock, Arkansas

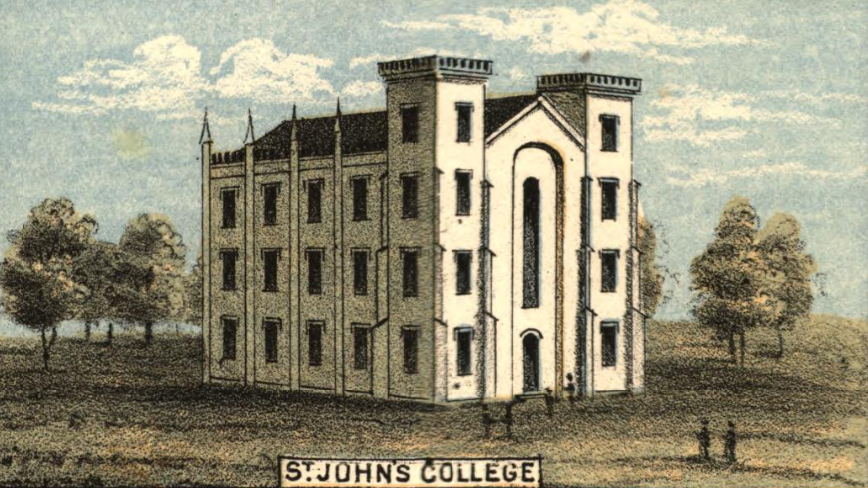
- Type: Private
- Active: October 6, 1859–1882
- Affiliations: Grand Lodge of Arkansas, F&AM
- Location: Little Rock, Arkansas, US

St. Johns' College was a college, preparatory school, military school, and primary school in Little Rock, Arkansas sponsored by the Masonic order. The college operated from 1859 to 1882, closing during the American Civil War and the Brooks–Baxter War. It was the first college chartered in Arkansas and the third in the state to open.

== History ==
In 1850, there were no colleges in Arkansas. The Masonic Fraternity of Arkansas began discussing this problem, with Grand Master Elbert H. English proposing the establishment of a college in Little Rock. The college was planned as a charity that would educate boys who could, then, become teachers in their communities. Five students from each Masonic District could attend for free, with the nomination of the Grand Master.

The college was named St. Johns' College for John the Evangelist and John the Baptist, Christian saints to whom Freemasons frequently dedicated their buildings. In this instance, the Masons decided to name the college for both saints, resulting in the plural name of St. Johns'.

The college was chartered by the Arkansas Legislature with the endorsement of Governor John Seldon Roane on December 31, 1850. It was the first college to be chartered in the state. George C. Watkins was the college's founding board president; English served as its secretary.

The board of trustees purchased 100 acres of land in Little Rock for $5,500 on July 16, 1852. James and William Vance donated five additional acres for the campus. Forty acres were set aside for the campus, with the remainder being set aside to generate income to support the college. It took the Masons five years to raise the funds to construct the college's buildings. In May 1857, the building committee advertised for bids for contractors to construct the stone foundation of a building for the new college. English's address at the cornerstone laying in 1857 is extant. It buildings were begun in 1857 and completed 1859.

Although St. Johns' College was the first institution of higher education to be chartered in Arkansas, it was the third to open for students. The college opened for classes for male students on October 6, 1859. The students were required to wear a military-style uniform, with variations for its two departments. The school's first president was John Baker Thompson, A.M.

When the Civil War started, three of the college's professors enlisted, followed by many students. The college closed in May 1861 and was used as a Confederate Hospital, with approval of the Masons. In September 1863, Union troops occupied Little Rock and the school was used for a Union hospital. It was a primary military hospital by 1865, treating more than 8,000 patients.

The military left the campus in the spring of 1867 and returned it to the college's trustees. They left behind temporary structures that needed to be demolished; their lumber was given to the college by the Secretary of War as payment for the use of the campus. In September 1867, the trustees announced plans to reopen in October, with Luke E. Barber, Esq. as president. He was assisted by Oliver Crosby Gray, a graduate of Colby College and veteran Confederate officer; Gray taught provided military instruction at the college for seven years and was later its president. However, the college's pre-war investments were in Confederate script, reducing its assets to the campus itself. Thus, the college liquidated some of its real estate to pay for the institution's faculty and building additions.

By 1869, the college had more than 100 students. A new dormitory was added in 1872 to house the growing student body. During the Brooks–Baxter War in 1874, the college closed while ousted Governor Elisha Baxter used the college as his base and the student cadets as his bodyguard. In the 1875-76 school year, it had three instructors and 55 students. Tuition was $50 per year and free for the sons of Masons. Richard H. Parham Jr., A.M., was its president in 1875, as well as a member of the Arkansas legislature.

The Grand Lodge of Arkansas stopped supporting it in 1878, leasing the college to Leo Baier, a professor at St. Johns'. Baier improved facilities and increased enrollment to 142 students in 1881. When Baier retired in 1882, W. J. Alexander took over his lease but failed to secure the funds needed to keep the college open. The Grand Lodge decided to sell the campus to raise funds for a new Little Rock Masonic temple. Although the campus was not sold until 1889, classes ended in 1882.

The former St. Johns' College buildings were destroyed in a fire on January 17, 1890. The former college campus is now MacArthur Park.

== Campus ==
St. Josephs' College was located on forty acres east of downtown Little Rock, Arkansas, near the Federal Arsenal (now MacArthur Park). The college's main building was a three-story brick building in Gothic Revival style. After the Civil War, ten acres were enclosed in a square around the existing buildings, with the remaining acres being laid out for development as part of the city, including housing for teachers and boarding houses for students.

== Academics ==
When the college opened in 1859, its curriculum included a three-year preparatory department and a collegiate department. Tuition for the former was $50 per year, and $60 per year for the latter. The college awarded four-year A.B. degrees, a three-year Sc.B degree, and a two-year Ph.B. degree. Students were taught astronomy, Greek, French, Latin, and mathematics, in addition to the classic liberal arts courses. It also provided military training and telegraph operator training.

In March 1860, the school opened its primary department, where students from the higher departments taught arithmetic, spelling, reading, and writing to boys of all ages for $25 a year. The college added a law department in 1873, when Robert Ward Johnson donated his personal law library. The law school's faculty included Henry Clay Caldwell, Augustus H. Garland, Uriah Milton Rose.

== Student life ==
St. Johns' College had a chapter of Chi Phi fraternity from 1873 to 1874.

== Notable alumni ==
- David O. Dodd, Confederate spy during the American Civil War
- John Gould Fletcher, imagist poet and the first Southern to win the Pulitzer Prize for Poetry
- Fay Hempstead, poet and writer
- Carroll D. Wood, associate justice of the Arkansas Supreme Court
