= David O. Dodd Memorial =

- U.S. National Register of Historic Places
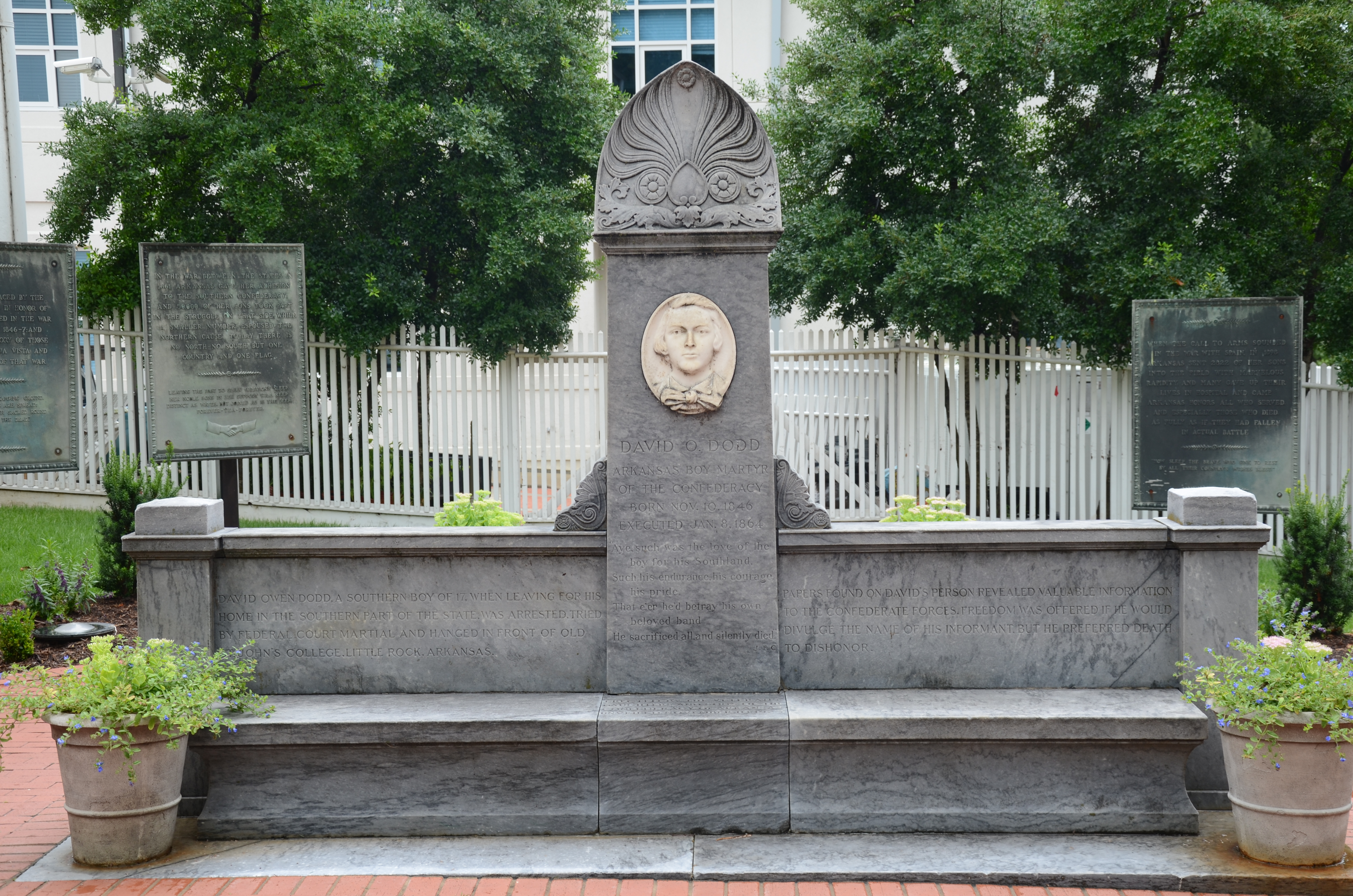
- David O. Dodd Memorial, 2015

- Location within Arkansas Location within the United States
- Location: Old State House,300 W. Markham St., Little Rock, Arkansas
- Coordinates: 34°44′56.3″N 92°16′19.42″W
- Area: less than one acre
- Built: 1923; 103 years ago
- Built by: Vermont Marble Co.
- Architectural style: Classical Revival
- MPS: Civil War Commemorative Sculpture MPS
- NRHP reference No.: 96000454
- Added to NRHP: April 26, 1996

The David O. Dodd Memorial is a monument on the grounds of the Old State House in Little Rock, Arkansas. Erected in 1923 by Confederate memorial groups, it commemorates David O. Dodd, an Arkansas civilian who was executed by the U.S. Army for spying. The monument has a horizontal base of gray marble, with a central columnar component, in which a relief portrait of Dodd is carved into white marble. It was listed on the National Register of Historic Places in 1996.

== See also ==
- Arkansas in the American Civil War
- National Register of Historic Places listings in Little Rock, Arkansas
