= Carolina blue =

One of the official colors of the University of North Carolina

Common connotations
- University of North Carolina

Color coordinates
- Hex triplet: #4B9CD3
- sRGB^{B} (r, g, b): (75, 156, 211)
- HSV (h, s, v): (204°, 64%, 83%)
- CIELCh_{uv} (L, C, h): (62, 63, 239°)
- Source: Color Palette. "Color Palette". UNC Chapel Hill.
- ISCC–NBS descriptor: Light blue
- B: Normalized to [0–255] (byte)

Carolina blue (occasionally referred to as Tar Heel blue or Dialectic blue) is the shade of blue used as one of the official school colors of the University of North Carolina.

== Background ==
The name is derived from the popular usage of "Carolina" to refer to the university. For clarity in branding and marketing, UNC Creative has defined the color as Pantone 542 and declared that the CMYK representation is Cyan 60%, Magenta 19%, Yellow 1%, and Black 4%. This CMYK results in a Hex code of #62C6F2 . However, the university has chosen the hex value of #4B9CD3 as their web safe Carolina Blue due to contrast issues and Section 508 web requirements. None of the colors match the selected Pantone 542 which would be a hex value of #6699C2 , RGB of (102,153,194), and a CMYK value of 47,21,0,24.

The North Carolina Tar Heels athletics department has their own formulation for Carolina blue. Carolina athletics blue has the same CMYK color representation as the university's version of Carolina blue, but the RGB representation for Carolina athletics blue is Red 123, Green 175, and Blue 212. This results in a Hex code of #7BAFD4 , the official matching hex code for Pantone 542 C.

== History ==
Use of the light blue color at UNC dates from 1795 when the Dialectic (blue) and Philanthropic (white) Societies of the university chose representative colors. Society members would wear a blue or white ribbon at university functions, and blue or white ribbons were attached to the diplomas of graduates. Light blue and white have been UNC's sporting colors since the 1880s, when UNC's football team adopted the light blue and white of the Di-Phi Societies as their colors.
