= Washington Literary Society and Debating Union =

Student group at the University of Virginia, US

- ΣΒΦ
- Founded: 1831; 195 years ago Refounded 1865, 1979; University of Virginia
- Type: Literary
- Affiliation: Independent
- Status: Active
- Emphasis: Debate, oratory
- Scope: Local
- Motto: Quam fluctus diversi, quam mare conjuncti "Though the waves are many, the sea is one"
- Member badge
- Colors: White Maroon
- Flower: White rose
- Philanthropy: The Haven, working to end homelessness in the Charlottesville community.
- Chapters: 1
- Nickname: The Wash
- Headquarters: Newcomb Hall; PO Box 400429; Charlottesville, Virginia 22904; United States
- Website: www.washingtonsociety.org

The Washington Literary Society and Debating Union (also known as "the Washington Society" or "the Wash") is a literary and debating group at the University of Virginia in Charlottesville. While its current incarnation is modern, the Society has roots back to the first decade of operation of the university and was founded in the mid-1830s.

The Society was reorganized twice, in two major historical partitions as the First Refounding (1865) and Second Refounding (1979). The First Refounding was led from members returning to the university after the Civil War. The Second Refounding of the Society was made possible by Mr. R. E. Heischman of Charlottesville, an active member of the Washington Society from 1923 until 1925, who administered the oath of membership on the night of November 16 pursuant to the code of the Society's 1929 constitution.

== History ==
The Washington Society was founded sometime in the years from 1834 to 1836 from the merger of the Academics Society and another literary society. Like other student activities in the early years of the university, its interactions with the faculty were turbulent, at one point leading the Board of Visitors to forbid students from delivering public speeches.

A Literary society in nature, from the beginning the group utilized the name "Washington Literary Society" in popular parlance. The Greek letters Epsilon Alpha Pi (ΕΑΡ) were the Greek letters of the Society prior to the adoption of Sigma Beta Phi (ΣΒΦ or Σβφ), which was adopted during the Second Refounding. The Society has historically referred to itself as "The Wash," "The Washington Society," and adopted abbreviations like "Wash Soc" in its minutes.

In its early years, the Society was active in University affairs with a focus on the literary arts. The Society spearheaded efforts to create the Jefferson Monument Magazine in 1848–49, whose proceeds financed a monument to Thomas Jefferson. Following the collapse of the Jefferson Monument Magazine in 1851, the society co-sponsored the University Magazine with the Philomathean and Jefferson Societies, beginning in 1851.

Like many student organizations at the university, the Washington Society was politically active in the secessionist cause in the years prior to the American Civil War. A resolution that had been in place since 1858 to avoid debate questions that "would bring up any of the political issues now distracting the country" was lifted in January 1860, and the society subsequently debated the questions of a state's right to secede (answering in the affirmative) and whether Virginia should secede from the union if Lincoln were elected president (also answering in the affirmative). In 1861, after the secession of Virginia from the Union, the Society voted to send its surplus treasury (about $200) to the Governor of the Commonwealth for the defense of the state.

All student activities, including the Washington Society, were suspended from 1861 through 1865 for the duration of the Civil War, but the Washington Society was the first to reactivate, holding its first postbellum meeting on October 14, 1865. William M. Perkins, A. Frederick Fleet, John H. Lewis, and John S. Harnsberger are known collectively as the First Refounders, who readjourned the Society after the Civil War. The Society cooperated with the Jefferson Society in raising money for the erection of a memorial to the university's Confederate casualties in the University Cemetery.

In 1913, the Washington Society joined forces again with the Jefferson Society to sponsor a "speaking league" for public and private high school students throughout the state. However, the activity of the Society subsequently fell off until it completely died out during the 1920s. Briefly reforming in 1939 as a society with the aim of "encouraging intellectual curiosity, gentlemanliness, congeniality and the idealization of the Virginia gentleman," it soon became extinct again until its modern refounding in 1979.

In 1979, Three members of the Jefferson Society, J. Mitchell Aberman, Stephen L. Huntoon, and Josiah (Josh) Hensen, reestablished the Washington Society with the help of Richard Nichols Randolph, who was initiated into the Washington Society over the phone by R.E. Heischman. Randolph then altered the constitution to allow members from the Jefferson Society to join, moving to induct the other three, who become the Second Refounders. A year later, in the fall 1980 semester, Leslie Eliason, the first female president and fifth member, established or reestablished most of the traditions that continue today, including Thursday meetings in Jeff Hall, and debates with the Jefferson Society.

== Symbols ==
The motto of the Washington Literary Society is Quam fluctus diversi, quam mare conjuncti or "Though the waves are many, the sea is one". Its colors are white and maroon. Its flower is the white rose. Its nickname is The Wash.

The Society also has several other mottos adopted during the years of the Second Refounding. "Get Involved and Speak Out!" was adopted during the Second Refounding years, likely in the spirit of student activism in the late 1970s. "Sigma Beta Phi, Conquer or Die!" is the Society's rallying cry, and Exitus acta probat, "the ends justify the means" is the Society's other Latin motto adopted from George Washington's coat of arms.

== Washington Hall ==
The Washington Society was without permanent meeting facilities from 1842 to 1849 when they were granted a room in Hotel B, where they remained through much of the 19th century. In 1852, the Society asked for permission to enlarge its room in Hotel B; University historian Philip Alexander Bruce notes that this was the origin of the use of the name Washington Hall to describe these chambers. In 1869, the reorganized society expanded the hall to its current dimensions. In the year 1896, following the burning of the Rotunda and the destruction of the Annex, law classes were held in Washington Hall. The university took possession of the Hall sometime after 1929 when there was no Society to maintain the building. Washington Hall now houses the University of Virginia's Office for Equal Opportunity and Civil Rights.

== Activities ==
The Washington Society generally meets on Thursdays at 8 pm when classes are in session at the University of Virginia in Hotel C of the university's West Range, known colloquially as "Jefferson Hall," the meeting place of the Society's peers in the Jefferson Literary and Debating Society. Special meetings, such as the inaugural meeting every semester, may be held in other locations to accommodate for new member interest. Meetings generally consist of several literary presentations and a debate between two teams. Literary presentations and debates range from humorous discussions to serious readings or reenactments of plays, dramas, poems, stories, and the like.

The Washington Society also participates in three annual debates with the Jefferson Society. The Ethics Debate is held in the fall semester and addresses questions of ethical decision-making. The Harrison Cup is a humorous debate held in the fall semester. The Smith-Simpson Debate on Foreign Policy was held between the two groups on a question of foreign policy in the spring and was endowed by R. Smith Simpson. The Smith-Simpson Debate occurs in the Dome Room of the Rotunda.

In addition to participating in inter-society debates, the Washington Society works to promote speech and debate more broadly. The Society hosts two literary competitions for University of Virginia students with a cash prize awarded to the winner. The Society used to sponsor an annual book drive and help coordinate a middle school debate club at Burley Middle School in Charlotteville. The Society used to jointly host a high school debate tournament alongside the American Parliamentary Debate Association organization at the university in February.

== Membership ==
Membership in the Washington Society is open to any current student at the University of Virginia. By signing the roll of the Washington Society, a student declares their intent to join and becomes a provisional member for a semester. Provisional members are required to complete a literary presentation and debate in front of the Society as well as perform an act of service. When a provisional member fulfills the requirements for membership, they are inducted into the Society as regular members. The Society may also grant honorary memberships to community members who have provided exceptional service to the Society.

== Notable members ==
- Mortimer Caplin, Commissioner of Internal Revenue and tax attorney
- Hardy Cross Dillard, judge of the International Court of Justice
- Armistead Mason Dobie, Senior Judge of the United States Court of Appeals for the Fourth Circuit and dean of the University of Virginia School of Law
- Robert Kent Gooch, football player and track athlete
- Fay Hempstead, poet
- John S. Mosby, Confederate cavalry commander; consul to Hong Kong and in the U.S. Department of Justice.
- Frederick Nolting, United States Ambassador to South Vietnam
- Paula Xinis, judge of the United States District Court for the District of Maryland

== Related ==
- (United Kingdom) : Cambridge Union Society
- (United Kingdom) : Oxford Union Society
- (United Kingdom) : The Durham Union Society
- (United Kingdom) : London School of Economics, Grimshaw International Relations Club
- (United States) : Yale Debate Association
- (United States) : Berkeley Forum
- (United States) : Jefferson Literary and Debating Society
- (France) : Olivaint Conférence
- (Germany) : Studentenforum im Tönissteiner Kreis
- : Olivaint Conference of Belgium

== Notes and references ==
- Bruce, Philip Alexander (1921). History of the University of Virginia: The Lengthening Shadow of One Man. New York: Macmillan.
