= Fay Hempstead =

American lawyer and poet

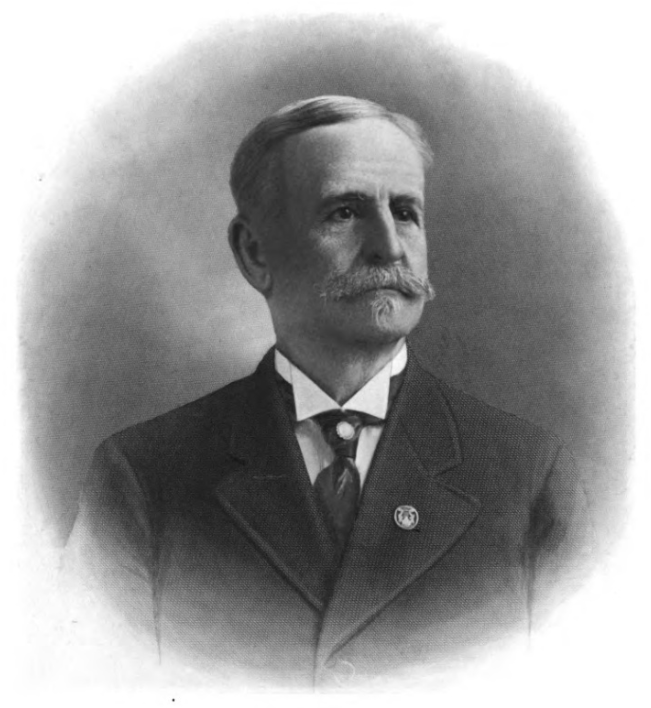
- Born: November 24, 1847; Little Rock, Arkansas, US
- Died: April 24, 1934 (aged 86); Little Rock, Arkansas, US
- Resting place: Mount Holly Cemetery
- Writing career
- Genres: Poetry and nonfiction

Signature
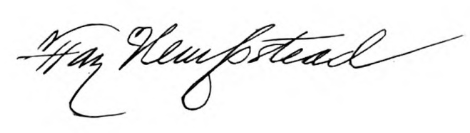

Fay Hempstead (November 24, 1847 – April 24, 1934) was an American poet, author, and lawyer. He wrote about Arkansas history and politics, authoring the state's first history textbook. He became the third Poet Laureate of Freemasonry in 1908. He was also the grand secretary of the Grand Lodge of Arkansas for 53 years.

== Early life ==
Hempstead was born in Little Rock, Arkansas on November 24, 1847. His parents were Elizabeth Rebecca (nee Beall) and Samuel Hutchinson Hempstead, an attorney and postmaster in Little Rock. He had private tutors and attended local private schools.

He attended St. Johns' College from 1859 to 1861; this college was sponsored by Masons and introduced him to Freemasonry. He studied law at the University of Virginia after the Civil War, from 1866 to 1868. While at the University of Virginia, he was a member of the Washington Literary Society and Debating Union and The Ugly Club, which selected him as the handsomest male.

== Career ==
Hempstead was a lawyer and partner in the firm of George A. Gallagher and Robert C. Newton in Little Rock from 1869 to 1872. He was the registrar in bankruptcy for Arkansas from 1874 to 1881.

He was a poet and author who wrote about Arkansas history and politics, authoring the state's first history textbook. His first collection of poems, Random Arrows, was published in 1878. One of his poems addressed evolution and science; others dealt with love, memory, and patriotism. He wrote a poem about travelers from Arkansas who were massacred in Utah.

Hempstead's coronation as the Poet Laureate of Freemasonry was held on October 5, 1908, in Chicago. Robert Burns was the first poet to receive this honor; Hempstead was the third.

== Personal life ==
On September 13, 1871, Hempstead married Gertrude Blair O'Neale of Charlottesville, Virginia. The couple had seven children.

Hempstead was a member of Christ Episcopal Church in Little Rock. He was a 33-degree freemason, serving as the grand secretary of the Grand Lodge of Arkansas for 53 years, starting in 1881. In 1891, he became the grand high priest of the grand chapter of the Royal Arch Masons. He became the recorder of the Grand Commandery of the Knights Templar in 1899. He was the puissant general grand master of Royal and Select Masters of the United States from 1921 to 1924.

Hempstead died following a lengthy illness on April 24, 1934, at his home in Little Rock, at the age of 86. He lay in state at the Arkansas State Capitol Rotunda. He was buried in Mount Holly Cemetery.

== Selected publications ==
=== Books ===
- A History of the State of Arkansas for the Use of Schools. New Orleans: F. F. Hansell & Bro., 1889.
- A Pictorial History of Arkansas, From the Earliest Times to the Year 1890. St. Louis: N. D. Thompson Publishing Company, 1890.
- Historical review of Arkansas: Its Commerce, Industry and Modern Affairs. vol. 1. Chicago: The Lewis Publishing Company, 1911.
- A History of Cryptic Masonry in Arkansas. Little Rock: Parke-Harper Publishing Co., 1922.

=== Poetry collections ===
- Random Arrows. Philadelphia: J.B. Lippincott & Co., 1878.
- Poems. Little Rock: Democratic Printing and Lithographing Company, 1908.
