= Gold Kist =

Chicken producing company

Gold Kist layer farm in Live Oak, Florida. Two 600' x 40' houses containing approximately 13,000 hens and 1,500 roosters each.

Gold Kist was a large chicken producing company in the southern United States. It was founded in 1933 by D.W. Brooks, a University of Georgia agronomy instructor as the Cotton Producers Association, a cooperative to help farmers in Carrollton, Georgia, market cotton. It soon grew and diversified into fields such as fertilizer and retailing farm supplies. It soon entered the poultry business. In 1998 it exited the agronomy business to focus on protein products, primarily chicken but also pork. In 2004, with the approval of its membership, it converted from being a cooperative to a for-profit stock-ownership company, listed on NASDAQ. In 2006, Gold Kist was acquired by Pilgrim's Pride.

== Operations ==
Gold Kist operated nine fully integrated poultry divisions in Alabama, Georgia, Florida and North and South Carolina. Each division operated its own hatchery, feed mill, and processing plant.

=== Co-op ===
Gold Kist contracted with approximately 2,300 family farmers to raise the chickens. The farmers would provide the houses, equipment, utilities and labor to grow the birds. Gold Kist provided the chicks, feed and technical assistance. When the chickens reached market weight, Gold Kist would process and market them. This contractual arrangement gave farmers access to global markets but reduced their exposure to market volatility.

== Farms ==
Gold Kist operated three types of chicken farms; pullet, layer, and broiler.

=== Pullet ===
==== Operations ====
The company's pullet farms are where select breeds are raised to about 20

=== Layers ===
==== Operations ====
On a Gold Kist layer farm pullets were grown for a few weeks along with roosters (about 1 rooster for every 8-10 hens) where they begin to mate and eventually lay eggs. The eggs that leave a Gold Kist layer farm (usually twice per week) were taken to the local division's hatchery. The birds were kept here for no more than 10 months.

==== Specifications ====
A Gold Kist layer house was usually 30–40 feet wide and 400–600 feet long. Each may house about 15,000 birds. A farm may contain a number of these but most contain only two side-by-side houses. Inside the house there are several automated systems including feed chains, water pipes, curtain drops, fans (two for every 100 feet (30 m) of length of the house), and a cool cell system acting like an air conditioning system during hot days.

=== Broiler ===
==== Operations ====
The layer hens' hatched chicks were taken to a Gold Kist broiler farm where they were grown from the day they hatch (usually just hours after hatching) for about 6 to 8 weeks.

==== Specifications ====
A Gold Kist broiler house was usually 30–40 feet wide and 400–600 feet long. Each may house thousands of chicks. A farm may contain a number of these; most contain about 4-6 houses. Inside the house there are several automated systems including feed chains, water pipes, curtain drops, fans, and a gas heating system to keep chicks warm. KFC uses Gold Kist Farm Chicken.
