= D. W. Brooks =

David William Brooks
- Born: September 11, 1901; Royston, Georgia
- Died: August 5, 1999 (aged 97); Atlanta, Georgia
- Occupations: Farmer; businessman
- Spouse: Ruth McMurray
- Children: David William Brooks Jr. & Nancy Ruth Brooks
- Parent(s): Lettie Jane Tabor & David William Brooks

David William Brooks (September 11, 1901 – August 5, 1999) was an American farmer and businessman.

Born in Royston, Georgia, Brooks enrolled at the age of 16 at the University of Georgia (UGA) and graduated with a Bachelor of Science in Agriculture (1922) and a Master of Science in Agriculture (1924). While working on his Masters, Brooks also taught agronomy at UGA as an instructor. He started his first farm cooperative, Georgia Cotton Growers Cooperative Association, in [1921] while still at UGA.

When this initial cooperative failed in 1933, Brooks started a new one under the name Georgia Cotton Producers Association. The name was changed to Cotton Producers Association (CPA) the following year and was eventually renamed Gold Kist in 1974. Brooks retired as Chairman of the Board of Gold Kist and was awarded the title of Chairman emeritus.

Brooks also founded several insurance companies that served the farming communities, Cotton Farmers Mutual Insurance Association (1941) and Cotton States Life and Health (1955)

On the UGA campus, a faculty award in the College of Agricultural and Environmental Sciences, a road and pedestrian mall are named in honor of Brooks.
