= Wesley L. Harris =

American academic

- Born: October 29, 1941 (age 84); Richmond, Virginia, U.S.
- Education: University of Virginia (BS) Princeton University (PhD)
- Occupation: Aerospace Engineer
- Awards: US National Academy of Engineering (1995)

Wesley L. Harris is an American aerospace engineer and the Charles Stark Draper Professor of Aeronautics and Astronautics at Massachusetts Institute of Technology. He has been awarded honorary doctorates by Milwaukee School of Engineering, Lane College and Old Dominion University.

Harris was elected a member of the National Academy of Engineering in 1995 for contributions to understanding of helicopter rotor noise, for encouragement of minorities in engineering, and for service to the aeronautical industry. His research interests include unsteady aerodynamics, aeroacoustics, and sickle cell disease and has authored over 130 technical papers.

== Early life ==
Wesley Leroy Harris was born in Richmond, Virginia on October 29, 1941, to Rosa Minor and William Harris who were both local tobacco factory workers. He grew up interested in learning and building models of airplanes. He won an essay contest writing about his future dreams to become a test pilot. In 1960, Wesley L. Harris graduated from Armstrong High School in Richmond. After graduation, he enrolled at the University of Virginia and married his high school sweetheart.

== Education ==
Wesley L. Harris graduated from the University of Virginia in 1964 with an Honors Bachelor's Degree in Aerospace Engineering. During his time at the University of Virginia, Harris was awarded by the American Institute of Aeronautics and Astronautics (AIAA) for his research into the flow of air over wing surfaces. He was also the first African American member of the elite debate group, the Jefferson Society. In March 1963, Harris was selected to introduce Dr. Martin Luther King Jr., who visited and gave a talk at the University of Virginia. Harris then went on to continue his education at Princeton University to complete his Master's degree in Aerospace and Mechanical Sciences in 1966. He earned his doctoral degree in 1968 at Princeton.

== Professional career ==
After graduation, Wesley L. Harris returned to the University of Virginia and was the first African American to receive a tenured faculty position and the first African American to teach Engineering. He taught at Southern University in 1970-71 during a leave of absence and then returned to the University of Virginia, this time as an associate professor. In 1972, Harris joined faculty at MIT, becoming a professor of Aeronautics and Astronautics. In 1975, Harris established the Office of Minority Education, the first of its kind at MIT.

In 1979, Harris began work at NASA as a Program Manager in the Fluid and Thermal Physics Office and Manager of Computational Methods. In 1980, Harris returned to MIT to hold various positions. In 1985, he was appointed as the Dean of the School of Engineering at the University of Connecticut. He served as the Chief Administrative Officer and Vice President at the University of Tennessee Space Institute from 1990 to 1993. From 1993 to 1995, Harris became the Associate Administrator for Aeronautics at NASA in charge of all personnel, programs, and facilities. In 2003, Harris became the Head of the Aeronautics and Astronautics programs at MIT. As of 2020, Harris is the Charles Stark Draper Professor of Aeronautics and Astronautics and Housemaster of New House Residence Hall at MIT. Wesley L. Harris became the vice president of the National Academy of Engineering in July 2022.

Harris researches many different areas from unsteady transonic flow analysis, aeroacoustics, microcirculation hemodynamics and sickle cell disease. He has over 136 technical papers and presentations, endowed professorships, and tenured lectureships. He has previously been the Chair and the Member of the U.S. Army Science Board, The National Science Foundation, and the National Research Council. He now holds many honorary degrees in the field of aerodynamics and aeronautics. Wesley L. Harris is a fellow of the African Scientific Institute, American Association for the Advancement of Science, American Physical Society, American Society for Engineering Education, Mathematical Association of America, National Academy of Engineering, National Technical Association, Cosmos Club, American Institute of Aeronautics and Astronautics, American Helicopter Society, and a board member of the Union of Concerned Scientists. Harris' contributions include the study of helicopter rotor noise, service to the aeronautical industry, and encouragement of minority students and scholars in engineering.

== Awards and honors ==
Awards bestowed on Wesley L. Harris
Year of Recognition	Award/Honor Name
1963	Tau Beta Pi
1963	The Jefferson Society
1966	Sigma XI
1970-1972	SIAM Visiting Lecturer
1979	Irwin Sizer Award, MIT
1981	Eminent Scholar, Norfolk State University
1982	Scholar in Residence, Millersville State College
1988	American Academy of Mechanics
1990	Honorary Alumni, University of Connecticut
1990	Milton Pikarsky Memorial Lecturer
1992	Herbert S. and Jane Gregory Distinguished Lecturer
1993	Conferie des Chevaliers du Tastevin

== Miscellaneous ==
In an interview with The History Makers on April 26, 2013, Harris stated that his favorite color is blue, his favorite food is steak (rib eye), his favorite time of the year is fall, his favorite vacation spot is home, and his favorite quote is, "The greatest gift is to give."
