= Jefferson Literary and Debating Society =

Student society at the University of Virginia

- ΦΠΘ
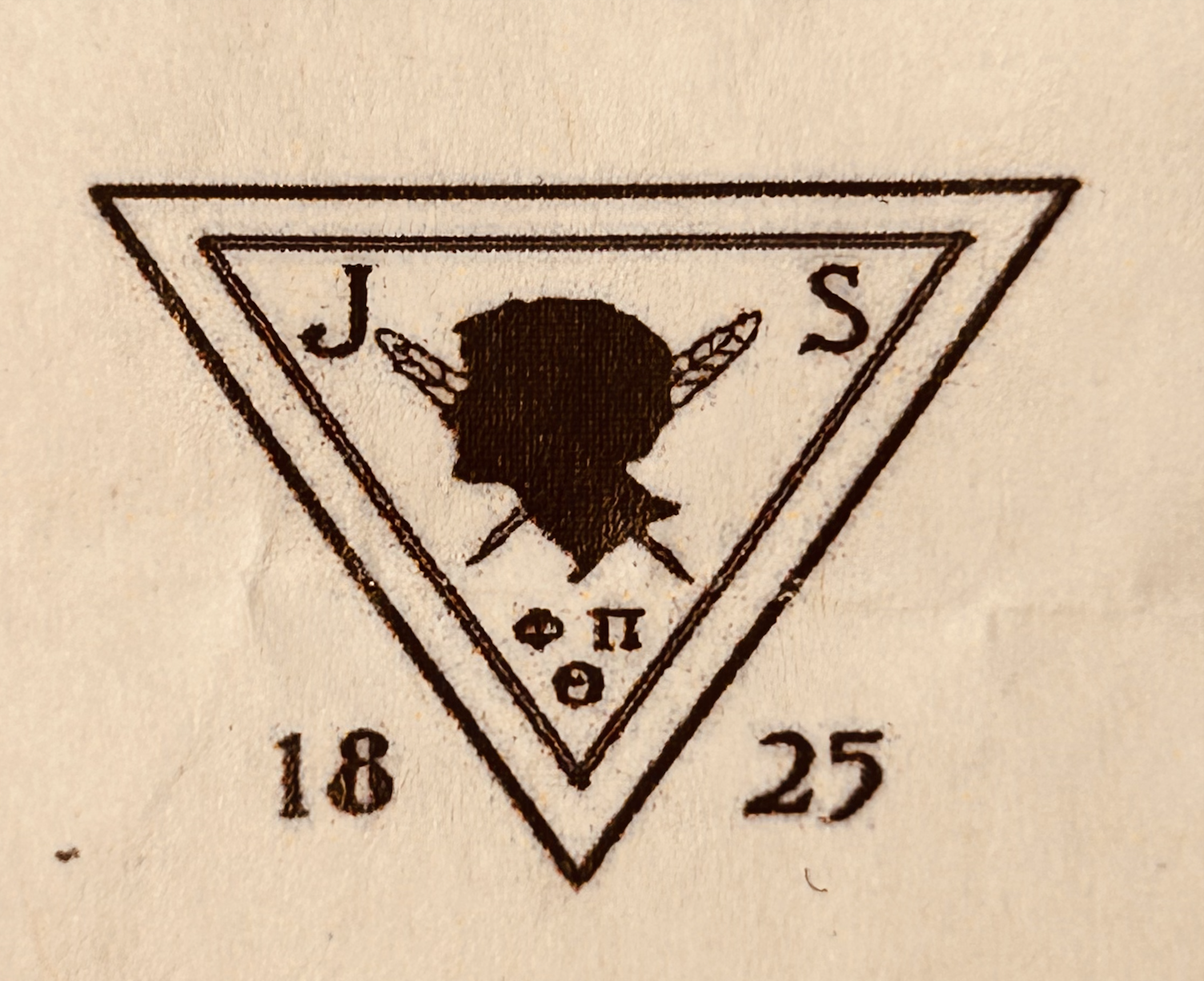
- Founded: July 14, 1825; 201 years ago University of Virginia
- Type: Literary
- Affiliation: Independent
- Status: Active
- Emphasis: Debating Society, Oratory, Écriture
- Scope: Local
- Motto: Haec Olim Meminisse Iuvabit
- Colors: Pink, Gray, and Blue
- Philanthropy: Restoration Ball (annually)
- Chapters: 1
- Nickname: The Jefferson Society
- Headquarters: University of Virginia, Hotel C, West Range (Jefferson Hall); Charlottesville, Virginia 22903; United States
- Website: jeffersonsociety.org

The Jefferson Literary and Debating Society (commonly known as "Jeff Society" or "Jeff Soc") is the oldest continuously existing collegiate debating society in North America. The society was founded on July 14, 1825, in Room Seven, West Lawn at the University of Virginia by 16 disgruntled members of the Patrick Henry Society. Named for the founder of the university, Thomas Jefferson, the society regularly meets on Friday evenings at "The Hall" on the Range.

The society's members have included several presidents of the United States, a British prime minister as well as governors, senators and congresspeople. Its motto, Haec Olim Meminisse Iuvabit, is taken from Virgil's Aeneid and roughly translates to, "In the future it will be pleasing to remember these things." Its Greek name ΦΠΘ, initials for Φίλοί, Πατρίς, θεός (philoi, patris, theos, or "brotherhood, fatherland, divinity"), makes the society the second-oldest Greek-lettered organization in the United States.

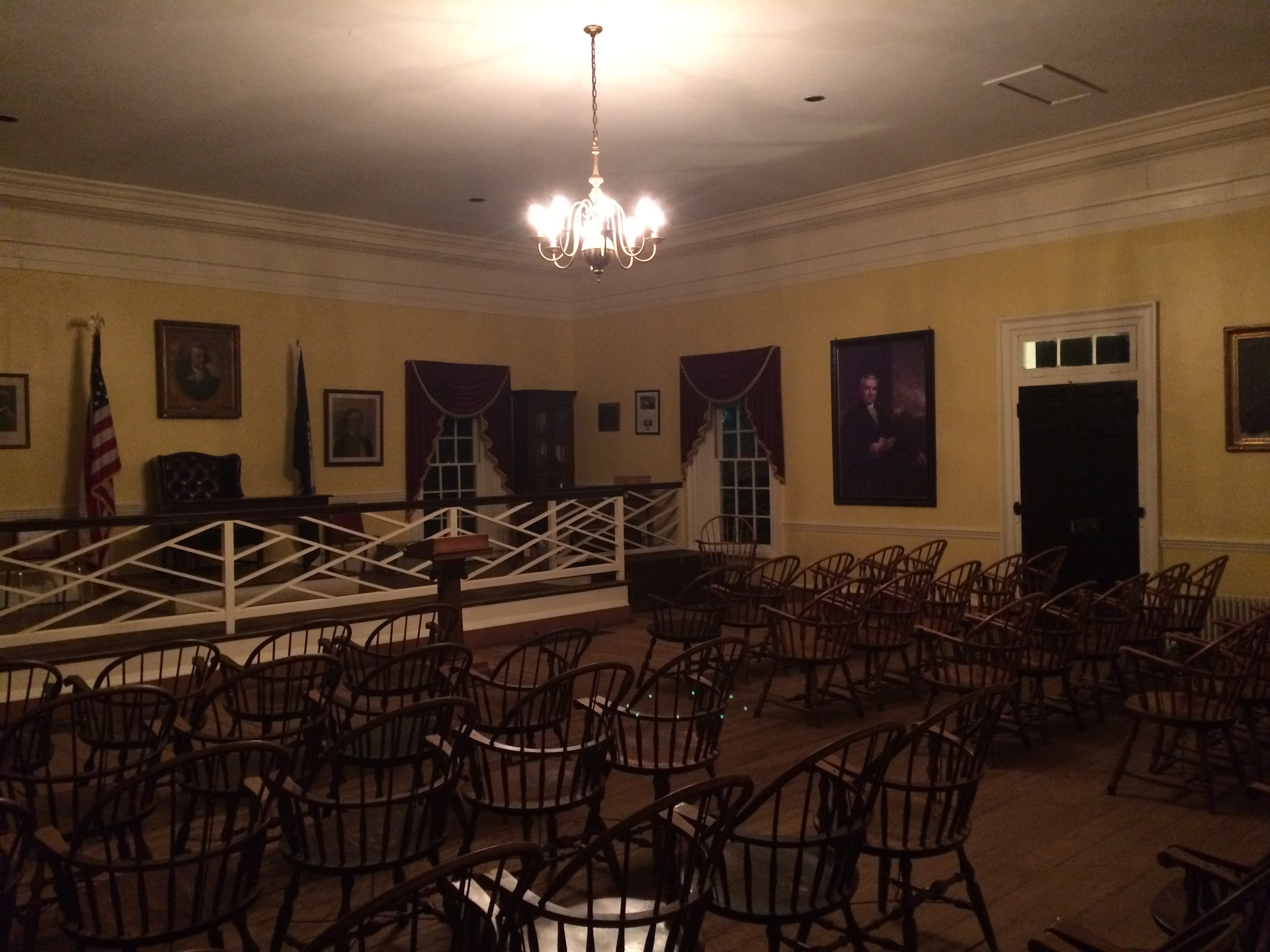
Jefferson Hall, Hotel C, West Range, University of Virginia

== History ==
Members on Founder's Day, April 13, 1867

Membership in the society grew rapidly in the early years after its founding. By 1855, the University of Virginia was the second largest university in the nation after Harvard University, enrolling 645 students. That school year, the society admitted 155 new members: nearly a quarter of the student body of the university.

In the hotheaded antebellum years, the society could become raucous. Its elections were condemned by the faculty for "such turbulence as to degrade the reputation of the University." An especially coveted honor was to be selected as "final orator," a post comparable to that of a valedictorian today.

The society played a key role in establishing student journalism at the university, founding the University Magazine as early as 1856. Later known as the Virginia Spectator, the paper played a major part in university life for a century, with its profile ranging from high seriousness to satire, until being shut down by the president of the university in the late 1950s for obscenity. In 1990, the Virginia Spectator experienced a brief revival which was short-lived due to the lack of sufficient funding. The Jefferson Society sponsored the magazine for many decades.

Also in 1856, the society expressed its approval of the caning of Charles Sumner by sending Preston Brooks a new gold-headed cane to replace his broken one. During the Civil War period (1861–1865), the membership of the society at that time, committed to the defense of the Southern States, decided to donate its entire treasury to the Confederate cause.

While the university remained open during the Civil War, the society was asked to leave Jefferson Hall temporarily in order to make way for the Charlottesville General Hospital established by the Confederate States of America and serving injured Confederate soldiers. A number of students withdrew from the university during the War in order to volunteer in this hospital, where both enslaved and free African-Americans also labored.

Since the antebellum and Civil War periods, the society has grown with the larger American and world culture — in the beginning, with difficulty. When Dr. Wesley L. Harris, the society's first African-American Member, and The Honorable Barbara M. G. Lynn, the society's first female Member, were inducted into the society following the successful completion of their probationary periods in 1963 and 1972, respectively, a significant number of Regular Members protested. Today, commissioned portraits of both Dr. Harris and Judge Lynn, alongside portraits of President Woodrow Wilson (photo), Mr. Edgar Allen Poe (photo), President James Madison, and President James Monroe, grace The Hall, now hosting a still dynamic and more diverse society Membership.

Continuing to confront the challenges of the past, in 1991, the briefly revived Virginia Spectator publicly defended Brad Ronnell Braxton, a fourth-year African-American undergraduate student and Lawn Resident at the University of Virginia who, after winning a Rhodes Scholarship, received hate mail from a self-professed university alumnus, "Dr. Bill Shepard".

In addition to its traditional meetings in The Hall, Room Seven, West Lawn, is maintained by the Jefferson Society, selecting a fourth-year student to live there.

The society hosts several events throughout the year including its Distinguished Speaker Series, for which it invites prominent scholars and speakers across academic disciplines to address students. The society also hosts formal social events including Wilson's Day, the Restoration Ball, and Founder's Day, first held in 1832.

== Symbols ==
The society's motto is Haec Olim Meminisse Iuvabit. Its colors are pink, gray, and blue.

== Art collection and archive (selected) ==
- The Sully Portrait is one of the only surviving life portraits of Thomas Jefferson. It was painted by artist Thomas Sully in 1819, and is presently loaned by the society to the University of Virginia for exhibition in the Rotunda. Thomas Sully is also linked to the society in other ways. In 1852, he painted a portrait of Pocahontas / Rebecca Rolfe (née Amonute, Matoaka), whose descendants went on to marry Mary Jefferson, the sister of Thomas Jefferson, and Woodrow Wilson, a notable society member.
- Edgar Allan Poe signed a minutes book one evening during which he served as secretary pro tem. His signature was later clipped out by Lancelot Blackford in the 1850s, stealing it, yet also saving it from the Great Rotunda Fire in 1895. Society alumni raised money to buy the signature from a collector in the early 1980s, in honor of their friend and fellow alumnus, James F. Perz. The signature is kept in secure storage as part of the university library's special collections.
- Thomas Woodrow Wilson signed one of the roll books during his tenure as the society's president. Furthermore, the society's minute books also contain many sets of handwritten minutes signed by Wilson when he was the society's secretary.

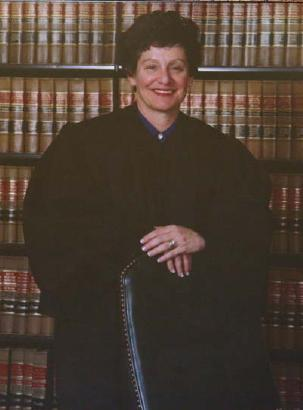
Chief Judge Barbara M.G. Lynn, c. 1999

== Notable members ==
- Edgar Allan Poe, author of "The Raven"
- Woodrow Wilson, 28th president of the United States
- Edward Stettinius Jr., secretary of state and ambassador to the United Nations
- Hugh Scott, United States representative and senator from Pennsylvania
- Colgate W. Darden, Governor of Virginia
- John T. Casteen III, University of Virginia president
- James Gilmore III, Governor of Virginia
- Roxane Gilmore, First Lady of Virginia
- Deidre Downs, Miss America 2005
- Jamelle Bouie, political correspondent and journalist
- Wesley L. Harris, Charles Stark Draper Prof. of Aeronautics and Astronautics, MIT
- Barbara M.G. Lynn, Chief United States District Judge

=== Honorary members ===
- James Madison, 4th President of the United States
- James Monroe, 5th President of the United States
- Gilbert du Motier, Marquis de Lafayette
- Edith Bolling Galt Wilson, former First Lady of the United States
- William Faulkner, Nobel Prize for Literature recipient
- Margaret Thatcher, former prime minister of the United Kingdom

Thomas Jefferson turned down an invitation for Honorary Membership in a letter dated August 12, 1825, citing his need to avoid altering his relationship with the university and its students.

== See also ==
- List of college literary societies
