= Dialectic and Philanthropic Societies =

Collegiate debating societies at the University of North Carolina at Chapel Hill

- Founded: June 3, 1795; 231 years ago University of North Carolina at Chapel Hill
- Type: Literary
- Affiliation: Independent
- Status: Active
- Emphasis: Debate
- Scope: Local
- Motto: Ad virtutem, libertatem, scientiamque
- Colors: Carolina blue and White
- Chapters: 1
- Nickname: DiPhi
- Headquarters: 310 New West Hall, East Cameron Avenue; Chapel Hill, North Carolina 27514; United States
- Website: diphi.web.unc.edu

The Dialectic and Philanthropic Societies, Inc. commonly known as DiPhi or The Societies, are the original collegiate debating societies at the University of North Carolina at Chapel Hill. The Dialectic Society was formed in 1795. The Philanthropic Society was formed a month later by former members of Dialectic. Together, these two societies comprise the oldest student organization at the university, as well as the oldest public student organization in the United States.

== History ==
The Dialectic Society was originally known as the Debating Society. Debating Society was established at the University of North Carolina (UNC) in 1795. It adopted the motto "Virtus et Scientia." The members stated their goals: "...to promote useful Knowledge..." and "...to cultivate a lasting Friendship with each other..." Significantly, the first order of business for the Debating Society was an order for the purchase of books. Because UNC had no library, the Debating Society's collection became the primary resource for the university, later becoming the core of the school's library.

One month after the founding of the Debating Society, the Philanthropic Society (originally known as the Concord Society) split off due to strict rules and political disagreements. It took a new motto, "Virtus, Libertas, et Scientia", with the addition of the word Libertas lending some insight into the reasons for splitting. In 1796 the two societies adopted the Greek equivalents of their names, becoming the Dialectic Society and the Philanthropic Society, known as the Di and the Phi for short. Due to the common use of the shortened form, "Philanthropic" is properly pronounced with a long "i" in the first syllable. This pronunciation informs the use of the Greek letter phi in the logo, despite its lack of affiliation with Greek Life at UNC.

In the early days of the university, students were required to join one of the two societies, and the rivalry between the two was extremely bitter. Society members would ride out on horses to greet incoming students, attempting to recruit them and dissuade them from joining the other society. According to legend, this rivalry eventually led to dueling. The university administration eventually intervened and changed the societies' official rules, making membership based upon geography with the Phi members coming from the eastern part of the state and the Di members from the western part (see below for a detailed description of this arrangement). Now together in a Joint Senate, the societies still maintain the rivalry in a more congenial way.

Shortly after the societies split, they each took a color. The Dialectic Society took a light blue, today known as Carolina blue, while members of the Philanthropic Society took white. Following a football game against the University of Virginia, in which UVA students displayed orange and blue pennants, the Societies' colors were adopted as the university's official colors.

Throughout the 19th century, the two societies engaged in an intense rivalry with each other for campus supremacy. The Societies trained students in oration, writing, and literature. In the thirty years before the Civil War, they also invited distinguished speakers (often alumni) to address the school at graduation. The addresses, which were multi-day graduation exercises, brought politicians, lawyers, physicians, and others to campus. One of the most important graduation speeches came from North Carolina Supreme Court Justice William Gaston in 1832, in which he urged the end of slavery. Those graduation speeches have proved an important source for gauging public attitudes towards union and constitutional law in North Carolina. They illustrate that UNC was substantially more moderate and more supportive of Union than other universities in the South.

It became the tradition of the societies to handle the funeral expenses of members who died while attending the university, and several members are now buried in the Societies' adjoining plots in the Old Chapel Hill Cemetery.

The Dialectic Society Chamber is located on the 3rd floor of New West Hall and the Philanthropic Society Chamber is located on the 4th floor of New East Hall. At one time, each Society's library was located on these floors with their meeting room (or the odeon) on the floor below.

The Societies suffered a steady decline in membership after the university ended the requirement that all undergraduate students belong to one of the societies. In addition, in 1904, the university established an independent student government, thus taking away a large amount of the power wielded by the Societies. By 1946, the last vestige of general student governmental power had been given over to the new Student Congress. The Societies still host an annual Student Body President debate for prospective candidates for the office of UNC Student Body President. By 1959, the Societies had joined together as a Joint Senate to preserve their membership rolls and today maintain a steady membership.

The Societies still meet together as a Joint Senate with the members of the Philanthropic Society sitting on the north side of the Dialectic Society Chamber and members of the Dialectic Society sitting on the south side of the chamber. Each society is responsible for putting forward a slate of candidates for Joint Senate officers every semester. These officers include the President of the Joint Senate, President Pro-Tempore, Critic, Clerk, Treasurer, Sergeant-at-Arms, and Historian.

== Symbols ==
The society's motto is Ad virtutem, libertatem, scientiamque. Its colors are Carolina blue and white. Its nickname is DiPhi.

== Membership ==
Membership in the societies is open to all UNC students. Students become senators by petitioning either the Dialectic or Philanthropic Society.

Traditionally, the society petitioned is determined by a student's county of origin. If the student was from North Carolina, to the east of Orange County, they would petition the Philanthropic Society. If they are from North Carolina to the west of Orange County, they would petition the Dialectic Society. If the student came from Orange County or was from another state or country entirely, they could choose their society. However, in their Fall Session of 2012, this was constitutionally altered and any prospective member can petition either society, regardless of their place of origin. Although once an integral part of determining membership, this tradition is maintained as simply that—a tradition, instead of a requirement.

When a prospective member decides to petition, they may ask any senator in the society they intend to join to act as their sponsor. A sponsor takes on the duty of teaching the petitioner about the history and function of the societies. It is often the case that potential petitioners will ask a senator who often participates in debates or is currently in an executive position due to their visibility. To become eligible, a student must attend three meetings, including the one before their petitioning, and must speak at least four times. One of these speaking occasions must be a speech given during the floor speech section of the meeting's program.

The petitioner must then deliver a petitioning speech on a topic of their choosing and field questions from the joint senate. Queries may challenge the petitioner to defend claims that they have made in their speech. The petitioner is also asked to complete a history section, comprised either of questioning on DiPhi history or of an oral report on a topic of DiPhi history chosen by the petitioner. They finally participate in a round of random questions, which may be humorous and challenge the petitioner to think on their feet. After the speech is completed, the petitioner leaves the room. All visitors are also asked to leave, and the chambers are sealed. Thus, the decision process is known only to active senators. The candidate is informed of the Joint Senate's decision within a week of the petition, through a letter delivered by the clerk of the Joint Senate.

The induction takes place at a later time. This is done during meetings, following the evening's program. Again, visitors are asked to leave, and the chambers are sealed while the secret ritual is carried out.

== Portraiture and furniture ==
The Dialectic and Philanthropic Societies Foundation holds one of the largest privately held portrait collections in the United States, composed mainly of 19th- and early-20th-century portraits of prominent former members, many of whom held positions of power in the State of North Carolina. It is believed that the Foundation has either the largest or second largest collection of William Garl Browne portraits in the world.

In addition, the Societies hold several pieces of mid-19th-century furniture in both chambers, some of which are pieces known to have been made by the famed free black furniture maker Thomas Day. The remainder of the pieces are likely the work of a similar furniture-maker.

== Programs ==
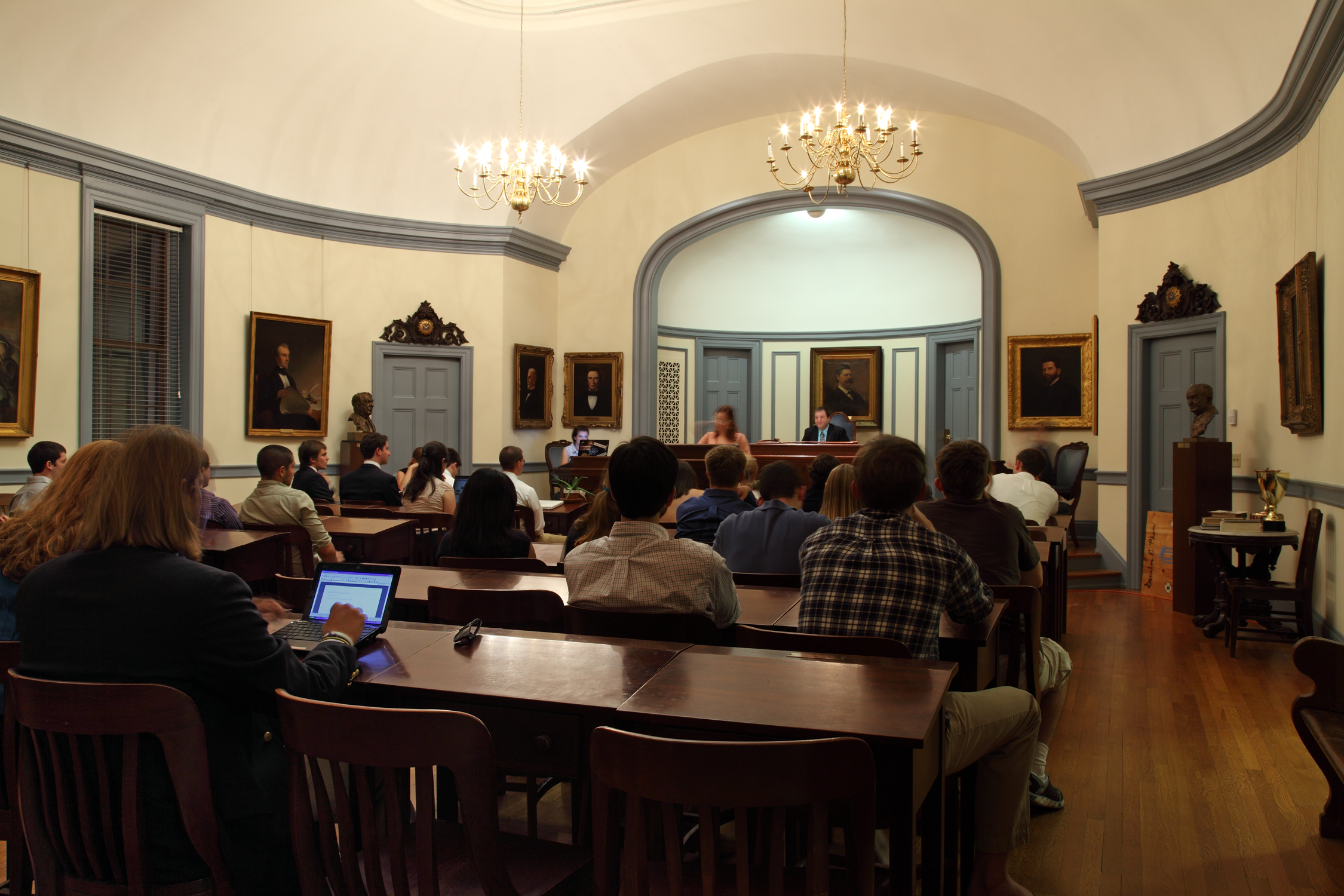
Dialectic and Philanthropic Societies debate in New West Hall

The Societies meet every Monday night at 7:30 post meridiem on the top floor of New West Hall while classes are in session. Meetings are held in the Dialectic Society Chamber, on the 3rd floor of New West, an academic building near the center of campus. Debates are held under the guidelines of parliamentary procedure and adhere to a modified Robert's Rules of Order. Resolutions are drafted in advance. For each debate, four members are scheduled as speakers: a primary affirmative and primary negative, who are both given seven minutes to deliver a speech, and a secondary affirmative and secondary negative, who are both given five minutes to speak. After delivering a speech, speakers must field queries from fellow senators and guests.

After the four scheduled speakers have finished, the President recognizes the speakers from the floor. Speakers from the floor may be members or guests. When time has elapsed for debate, the Societies hold two votes. The first is open to anyone in the chamber while the second is open only to active senators. Anyone may abstain from voting, although this is lightheartedly frowned upon and is usually met with hisses and jeers. The result of the vote is entered into the Societies' archives.

Business of the Societies follows the program, Old and then New. Reports of Officers are made at this time.

The most popular part of the meeting is PPMA: Papers, Petitions, Memorials, and Addresses. Historically, they are assigned by class, with freshmen presenting Papers, sophomore Petitions, and so forth; however, anyone is free to speak on any topic. Since this portion of the evening often has the most speakers, time limits are generally kept at five minutes; decorum suggests the speaker requests an extension before beginning to speak. There are no time limits for Memorials.

The Report of the Critic concludes the meeting; members and interested guests then adjourn to the top floor of New East for light refreshment and to foster the "bonds of amity."

The Societies also regularly hold special programs outside of their regular meetings. The Margaret Evans Lerche Lecture, named for the first female president of either society, is a formal lecture that seeks to enlighten the university community regarding its past, traditionally given on the evening of University Day. The Mangum Medal is the oldest student-given award at UNC. It is the Chancellor’s Award for oratory, given each year to a graduating senior. This award is managed by the Societies, who typically determine the winner of the medal based on an oratorical competition. Poe By Candlelight is a literary event held each year around Halloween, celebrating macabre poetry and other frightening literature, particularly that of Edgar Allan Poe.

== Governance ==
The societies are governed by a Joint Senate, with the following officers:

President: This individual presides over all meetings and maintains the authority to pass or deny any motions per the voting of the Joint Senate. This individual also attends all committee meetings and supports the committees in their various tasks.

President Pro Tempore: This individual is the constitutional officer and essentially the vice president of the Joint Senate. They chair the Executive Committee and the Constitutional Committee and are responsible for maintaining order at meetings.

Critic: This individual is responsible for critiquing and scoring the speeches presented during meetings. They offer notes and any suggestions or commentaries they would like to share upon the conclusion of the debate. The Critic is also able to appoint a Recensioner to assist with the planning of programs and other responsibilities of the Critic.

Clerk: This individual is tasked with taking the minutes of meetings, managing the Societies' correspondence, and depositing records in the Societies' archives. The Clerk appoints a Correspondent to assist with the Societies' communications and with other responsibilities of the Clerk.

Treasurer: This individual is tasked with collecting dues and managing the Societies' finances. However, they cannot chair the Finance Committee.

Sergeant at Arms: This individual is responsible for maintaining the Societies' chambers and book and portrait collections. The SAA appoints a Curator to assist with maintaining the Societies' portrait collection and library and other responsibilities.

Historian: This individual is charged with knowing and upholding the traditions and customs of the Societies. The Historian appoints an Archivist to assist with maintaining the genealogical records of the Societies and with other responsibilities of the Historian.

President of the Dialectic Society: This individual represents the Dialectic Society at meetings and on the Executive Committee.

Speaker of the Philanthropic Society: This individual represents the Philanthropic Society at meetings and on the Executive Committee.

== Notable members ==
=== Dialectic Society ===
- Thomas L. Clingman, mountaineer, surveyor, United States Senate, and United States House of Representatives
- Sam Ervin, United States Senate and United States House of Representatives
- Wayne Goodwin, chair of the North Carolina Democratic Party and North Carolina Commissioner of Insurance
- William Alexander Graham, U.S. Secretary of the Navy, United States Senate, and Governor of North Carolina
- Luther H. Hodges, United States Secretary of Commerce and Governor of North Carolina
- Hatcher Hughes, Pulitzer Prize-winning dramatist
- Willie P. Mangum, United States Senate and United States House of Representatives
- Charles Duncan McIver, the founder and first president of what is now known as the University of North Carolina at Greensboro
- John Motley Morehead, Governor of North Carolina and president of the North Carolina Railroad
- James K. Polk, President of the United States
- John L. Sanders, drafter of the 1971 North Carolina Constitution and dean emeritus of the UNC School of Government
- David Swain, Governor of North Carolina and president of the University of North Carolina
- Thomas Wolfe, Pulitzer Prize-winning novelist
- Zebulon Vance, Governor of North Carolina, United States Senate, and United States House of Representatives
- Sidney Rittenberg, senior member of the Chinese Communist party and an adviser to Mao Zedong

=== Philanthropic Society ===
- Charles Brantley Aycock, Governor of North Carolina
- Johnston Blakeley, U.S. Navy captain in the War of 1812
- Caleb Bradham, inventor of Pepsi
- John Branch, U.S. Secretary of the Navy, United States Senate, United States House of Representatives, Governor of the Florida Territory, and Governor of North Carolina
- Marion Butler, United States Senate
- James C. Dobbin, U.S. Secretary of the Navy and United States House of Representatives,
- John C. B. Ehringhaus, Governor of North Carolina
- Paul Green, Pulitzer Prize-winning playwright
- Mǎ Hǎidé, Maoist-era Chinese public health official
- William R. King, Vice President of the United States, United States Senate, and United States House of Representatives
- John Y. Mason, United States Attorney General, U.S. Secretary of the Navy, and United States House of Representatives
- David Price, United States House of Representatives
- William B. Ruger, firearms designer and founder of Sturm, Ruger & Co.
- Jacob Thompson, United States Secretary of the Interior and United States House of Representatives
- William B. Umstead, Governor of North Carolina, United States Senate, and United States House of Representatives

== Leadership of the Second Session of the 231st Year of the Societies (Fall 2026) ==
=== Joint Senate Leadership ===
- Joint Senate President: Aakash S. Palathra, Philanthropic Society
- President Pro Tempore: Ella S. Smith, Philanthropic Society
- Critic: Samuel W. Harper, Dialectic Society
- Clerk: Elizabeth A. Jenkins, Philanthropic Society
- Treasurer: Jiya Bhadra, Dialectic Society
- Sergeant-at-Arms: Maggie E. Pearcy, Philanthropic Society
- Historian: Hadley J. Pridgen, Dialectic Society

=== Individual Societies ===
Dialectic Society

- President: Lilah M. Childers
- Censor Morum: Liam P. Kiley
- Recorder: Jacob Binder
- Chamberlain: Elias North

Philanthropic Society

- Speaker: Joseph England
- Speaker Pro Tempore: Elizabeth Jenkins
- Parliamentarian: Lochlan Downard
- Sergeant-at-Arms: Logan A. Brown

== Previous Joint Senate Presidents ==
Name	Term	Session	Society
Christopher McClanahan	Spring 2026	230-2	Di
Katherine O. Fiore	Fall 2025	230-1	Di
Cormac K. Lynch	Spring 2025	229-2	Di
Anna E. Crist	Fall 2024	229-1	Di
Deniz A. Erdal	Spring 2024	228-2	Di
Nathaniel G. Shue	Fall 2023	228-1	Di
Marie I. Thorn	Spring 2023	227-2	Phi
Valerie A. Calvo	Fall 2022	227-1	Di
Justin Hall	Spring 2022	226-2	Di
Anna K. Fiore	Fall 2021	226-1	Di
Mo van de Sompel	Spring 2021	225-2	Di
Maggie Pollard	Fall 2020	225-1	Di
Jack Watson	Spring 2020	224-2	Phi
Kevin Gauch	Fall 2019	224-1	Phi
Katrina Smith	Spring 2019	223-2	Phi
Luke DeMott	Fall 2018	223-1	Phi
Quinn Gross	Spring 2018	222-2	Phi
Ronald Ding	Fall 2017	222-1	Di
Ryan White	Spring 2017	221-2	Di
Michael Johnston	Fall 2016	221-1	Phi
Tyler Clay	Spring 2016	221-2	Di
Sarah Elizabeth Pickhardt	Fall 2015	221-1	Phi
Will Robertson	Spring 2015	220-2	Di
Isaac Warshauer	Fall 2014	220-1	Di

== See also ==
- Collegiate literary societies
