= Statue of Mary McLeod Bethune =

Statue of Mary McLeod Bethune may refer to:

- Mary McLeod Bethune Memorial
- Statue of Mary McLeod Bethune (Jersey City, New Jersey)
- Statue of Mary McLeod Bethune (U.S. Capitol)
