= 1964 South Carolina Senate election =

- November 3, 1964

23 of 46 seats in the South Carolina Senate 24 seats needed for a majority
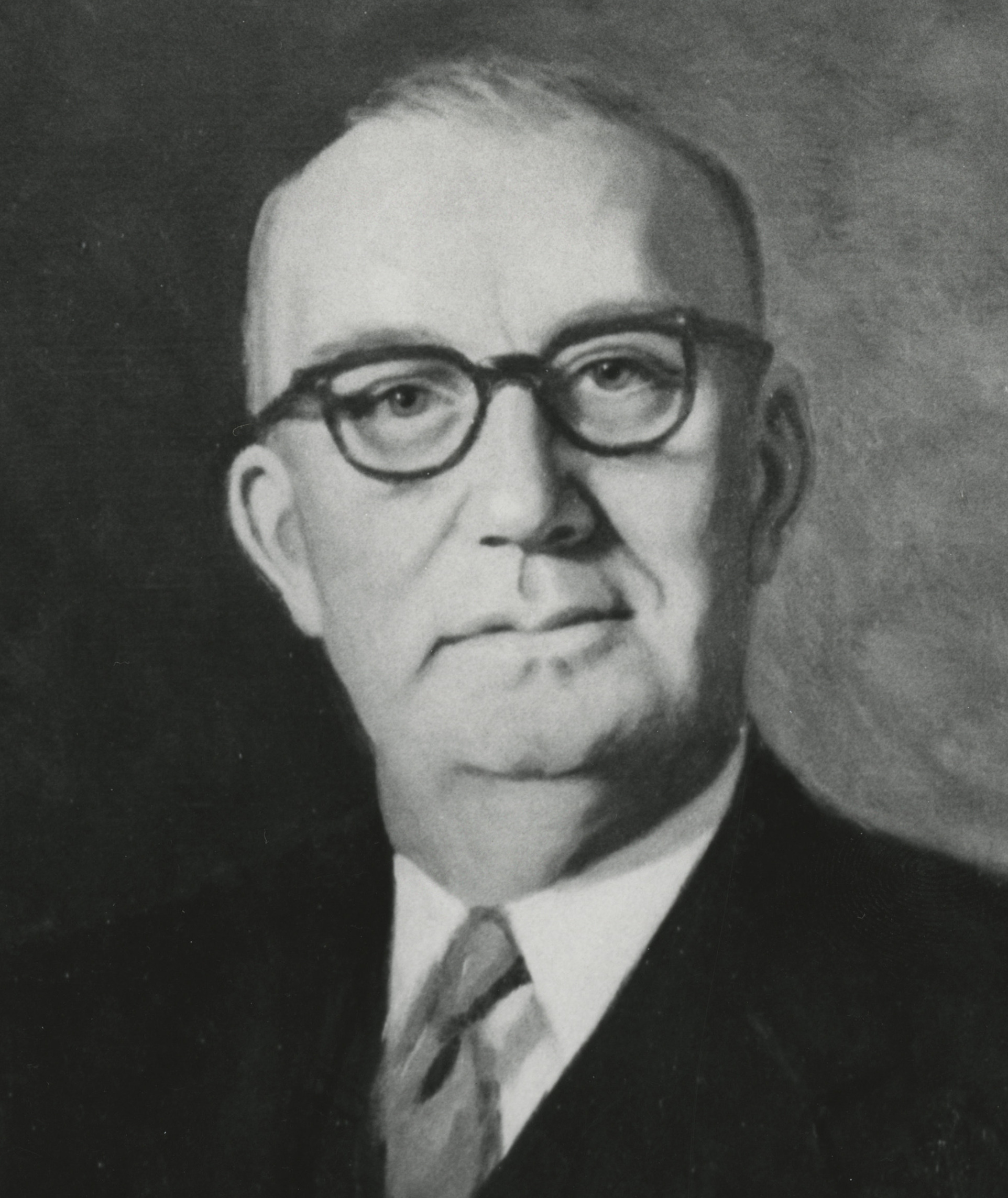

	Majority party	Minority party
Leader	Edgar Allan Brown	—
Party	Democratic	Republican
Leader since	1942	—
Leader's seat	Barnwell Co.	—
Last election	24 seats, 65.04%	0 seats, 34.92%
Seats before	46	0
Seats won	23	0
Seats after	46	0
Popular vote	52,506 (Note: Excludes vote totals from uncontested seats)	24,914
Percentage	66.18%	31.40%
- New Democratic senator elected Democratic incumbent senator re-elected Democratic: 50–60% 70–80% 80–90% Unopposed
President before election
Edgar Allan Brown
Democratic
Elected President
Edgar Allan Brown
Democratic

An election in the U.S. state of South Carolina was held on November 3, 1964 to elect 23 of the South Carolina Senate's 46 members to four-year terms. Five of the 23 seats were at stake in the general election, four contested by Republicans and one by a draft write-in campaign. Every seat up for election was won by the nominee of the Democratic Party. For most seats, the real contests were the Democratic primary elections, with a first round on June 9 and a runoff election on June 23.

Of the 23 senators up for re-election, all sought another term. In the first round of the Democratic primary, seventeen incumbent senators won renomination outright, ten of whom were unopposed. Four senators lost renomination outright, including a reversed result, and two advanced to a runoff. One senator won renomination and the other lost renomination in the runoff.

== 1963–64 special elections ==
=== Chester County ===
A special election was held on September 8, 1964, to fill the unexpired term of Chester County state senator Wilbur G. Grant to serve until the 1966 general election. Grant died of a heart attack in June 1964. Political newcomer Paul Hemphill Jr., cousin of U.S. representative and federal judge Robert W. Hemphill, defeated J. D. Leitner 2,994 votes to 2,186 votes in the Democratic primary on July 28. Hemphill did not draw any Republican or independent opposition and won the subsequent special general election with 1,026 votes, with only five write-in votes cast against him. He took office on September 16.

== Overview ==
County	Incumbents		Candidates	Result
County	Senator	Party	Candidates	Result
Aiken	Edward Cushman	Democratic	General election: ▌ ✓ Edward Cushman (Democratic) 12,788 votes, 51.55%; ▌Marion Hartzog Smoak (Republican) 12,019 votes, 48.45%; Democratic primary: ▌ ✓ Edward Cushman	Incumbent re-elected.
Bamberg	P. Eugene Brabham	Democratic	▌ ✓ Frank R. Hartzog; ▌P. Eugene Brabham	Incumbent lost renomination. New member elected. Democratic hold.
Barnwell	Edgar Allan Brown	Democratic	▌ ✓ Edgar Allan Brown	Incumbent re-elected.
Beaufort	James M. Waddell Jr.	Democratic	▌ ✓ James M. Waddell Jr.; ▌Lou M. Neale	Incumbent re-elected.
Calhoun	Marion Gressette	Democratic	▌ ✓ Marion Gressette	Incumbent re-elected.
Dorchester	H. H. Jessen	Democratic	▌ ✓ H. H. Jessen; ▌W. S. Horne	Incumbent re-elected.
Edgefield	Frank E. Timmerman	Democratic	▌ ✓ William A. Reels; ▌Frank E. Timmerman	Incumbent lost renomination. New member elected. Democratic hold.
Fairfield	Ben F. Hornsby	Democratic	General election: ▌ ✓ John A. Martin (Democratic) 2,603 votes, 57.51%; ▌Ben F. Hornsby (Write-in) 1,923 votes, 42.49%; Democratic primary: ▌ ✓ John A. Martin 2,088 votes, 50.05%; ▌Ben F. Hornsby: 2,084 votes, 49.95%	Incumbent lost renomination. New member elected. Democratic hold.
Georgetown	C. C. Grimes	Democratic	▌ ✓ C. C. Grimes	Incumbent re-elected.
Greenville	P. Bradley Morrah	Democratic	▌ ✓ P. Bradley Morrah	Incumbent re-elected.
Greenwood	Francis Nicholson	Democratic	General election: ▌ ✓ Francis Nicholson (Democratic) 8,903 votes, 79.17%; ▌Olyn L. Gee (Republican) 2,342 votes, 20.83%; Democratic primary: ▌ ✓ Francis Nicholson; ▌Marion P. Carnell	Incumbent re-elected.
Horry	James P. Stevens	Democratic	▌ ✓ James P. Stevens; ▌E. Windell McCrackin; ▌G. Stanley Bryant	Incumbent re-elected.
Jasper	Henry C. Walker	Democratic	▌ ✓ Henry C. Walker	Incumbent re-elected.
Laurens	King Dixon	Democratic	Democratic runoff: ▌ ✓ W. C. Dobbins: 3,228 votes, 51.92%; ▌King Dixon: 2,989 votes, 48.08%; Democratic primary: ▌ King Dixon; ▌ W. C. Dobbins; ▌David S. Taylor	Incumbent lost renomination. New member elected. Democratic hold.
Lexington	Francis C. Jones	Democratic	General election: ▌ ✓ F. Beasley Smith (Democratic) 8,789 votes, 55.24%; ▌G. Wilson Hunter (Republican) 7,123 votes, 44.76%; Democratic primary: ▌ ✓ F. Beasley Smith; ▌Francis C. Jones	Incumbent lost renomination. New member elected. Democratic hold.
Marion	J. Ralph Gasque	Democratic	▌ ✓ J. Ralph Gasque	Incumbent re-elected.
McCormick	L. L. Hester	Democratic	▌ ✓ L. L. Hester; ▌Hugh C. Brown	Incumbent re-elected.
Newberry	J. F. Hawkins	Democratic	▌ ✓ J. F. Hawkins	Incumbent re-elected.
Oconee	Marshall J. Parker	Democratic	▌ ✓ Marshall J. Parker; ▌S. P. Wells	Incumbent re-elected.
Orangeburg	Marshall B. Williams	Democratic	▌ ✓ Marshall B. Williams	Incumbent re-elected.
Saluda	Fred G. Scurry	Democratic	▌ ✓ Fred G. Scurry; ▌W. F. Sample	Incumbent re-elected.
Spartanburg	Charles C. Moore	Democratic	Democratic runoff: ▌ ✓ Charles C. Moore: 8,503 votes, 56.21%; ▌Paul Moore: 6,625 votes, 43.79%; Democratic primary: ▌ Charles C. Moore; ▌ Paul Moore; ▌John A. Munn	Incumbent re-elected.
York	Robert W. Hayes	Democratic	General election: ▌ ✓ Robert W. Hayes (Democratic) 19,423 votes, 84.99%; ▌Clark Adicks (Republican) 3,430 votes, 15.01%; Democratic primary: ▌ ✓ Robert W. Hayes	Incumbent re-elected.

== Fairfield Democratic primary controversy ==
In the first round of the Democratic primary for Fairfield County's state senate seat, incumbent senator Ben F. Hornsby appeared to defeat former senator John Martin by six votes in unofficial tallies. After a mandatory recount, Hornsby's lead grew to eleven votes for a final vote count of 2,082–2,071, and the county Democratic executive committee certified Hornsby's nomination. Martin did not concede, and chose to appeal the decision to the state Democratic executive committee. The SDEC met in Columbia in June 30 to settle the dispute.

Twenty-five ballots were in question. In the original recount, the county had thrown out twenty-three for being improperly marked. Upon further examination of the ballots, the SDEC determined that seventeen belonged to Martin, four to Hornsby, with the remaining four being unintelligible. This was enough to reverse the election in Martin's favor, and the SDEC ruled Martin the victor, 2,088 votes to 2,084, a four-vote margin. Upon learning of his defeat, Senator Hornsby left the meeting and checked out of his hotel.

Hornsby declined to fight the ruling in the courts. Under South Carolina law, candidates who lost a primary could not contest or campaign in the general election. A write-in campaign led by Columbia attorney Malcolm E. Rentz was organized without consulting Hornsby in an attempt to re-elect him. A large number of local voters backed the effort, but it was ultimately unsuccessful, as Democratic nominee Martin was elected over Hornsby at the general election by 680 votes, 2,603 to 1,923.
