= 1960 South Carolina Senate election =

- November 8, 1960

23 of 46 seats in the South Carolina Senate 24 seats needed for a majority
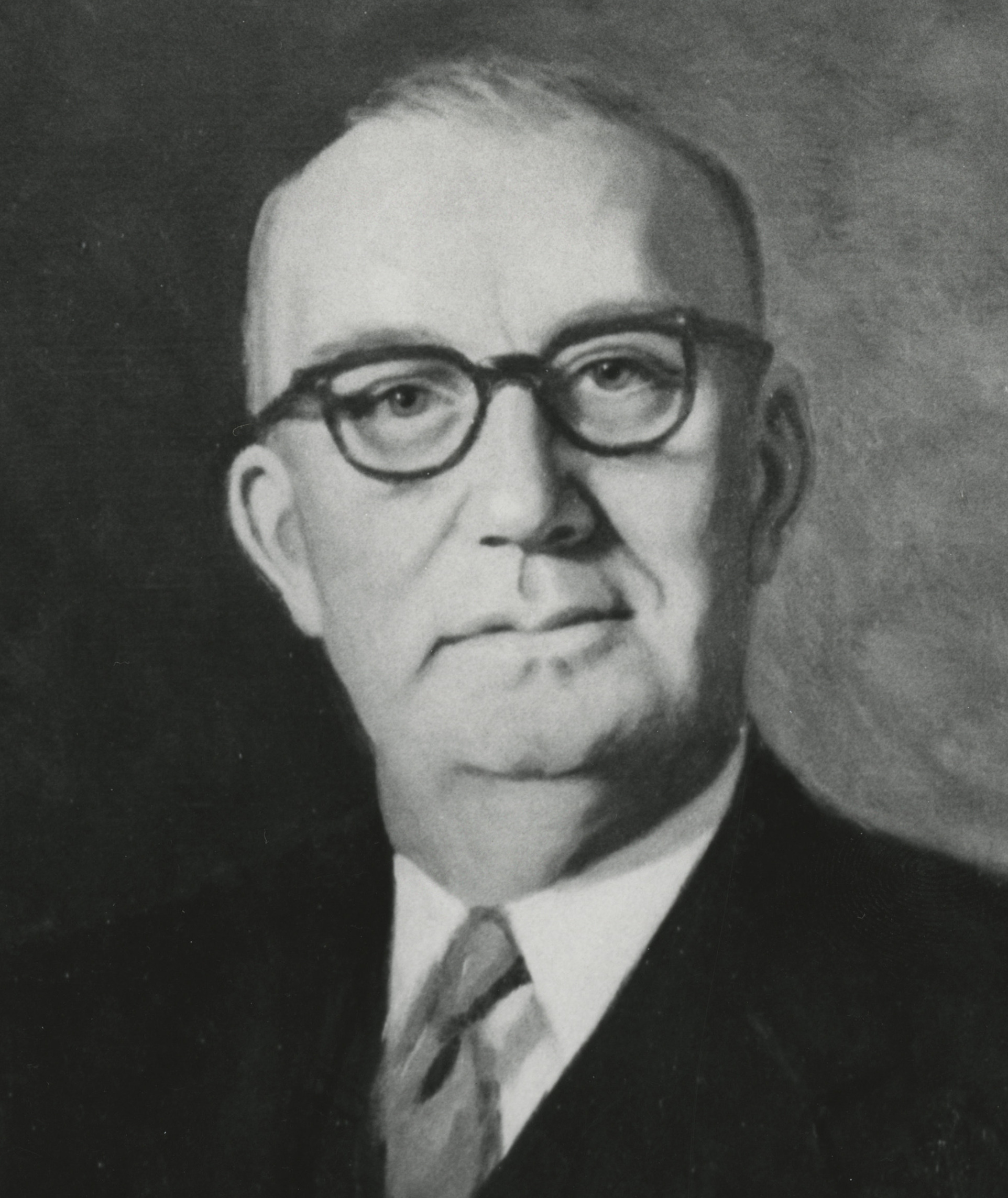
	Majority party
Leader	Edgar Allan Brown
Party	Democratic
Leader since	1942
Leader's seat	Barnwell Co.
Last election	23 seats
Seats before	46
Seats won	23
Seats after	46
Popular vote	100%
- District results New Democratic senator elected Democratic incumbent senator re-elected
President before election
Edgar Allan Brown
Democratic
Elected President
Edgar Allan Brown
Democratic

An election in the U.S. state of South Carolina was held on November 8, 1960 to elect 23 of the South Carolina Senate's 46 members to four-year terms. Every seat up for election was won by the nominee of the Democratic Party. Furthermore, every last Democratic nominee won in the general election completely unopposed, making the real contest the Democratic primaries, held on June 14 and June 28.

Of the 23 senators up for election, seventeen chose to run again, leaving six open seats. Of the seventeen, two lost renomination. Longtime incumbent president pro tempore Edgar Allan Brown was re-elected to his post by the chamber in January 1961.

The elections were held concurrently with those for U.S. presidential electors, U.S. Senate, U.S. House, state house, and numerous other state and local elections.

== Overview ==
County	Incumbents		Democratic primaries	Result
County	Senator	Party	Democratic primaries	Result
Aiken	Dorcey Lybrand	Democratic	▌ ✓ Edward Cushman; ▌Pope Gantt	Incumbent did not seek re-election. New member elected. Democratic hold.
Bamberg	Percy E. Brabham	Democratic	▌ ✓ Percy E. Brabham; ▌F. R. Hartzog	Incumbent re-elected.
Barnwell	Edgar Allan Brown	Democratic	▌ ✓ Edgar Allan Brown	Incumbent re-elected.
Beaufort	E. Burt Rodgers	Democratic	▌ ✓ James M. Waddell; ▌W. F. Sample	Incumbent did not seek re-election. New member elected. Democratic hold.
Calhoun	Marion Gressette	Democratic	▌ ✓ Marion Gressette	Incumbent re-elected.
Dorchester	J. D. Parler	Democratic	▌ ✓ H. H. Jessen; ▌Clifford S. Jones	Incumbent did not seek re-election. New member elected. Democratic hold.
Edgefield	F. E. Timmerman	Democratic	▌ ✓ F. E. Timmerman; ▌W. P. Yonce	Incumbent re-elected.
Fairfield	John C. Martin	Democratic	▌ ✓ B. W. Hornsby; ▌John C. Martin	Incumbent lost renomination. New member elected. Democratic hold.
Georgetown	James B. Morrison	Democratic	▌ ✓ James B. Morrison	Incumbent re-elected.
Greenville	P. Bradley Morrah	Democratic	▌ ✓ P. Bradley Morrah; ▌Ted P. Watson	Incumbent re-elected.
Greenwood	J. William Bradford (Note: Elected in May 1959 to fill the unexpired term of Alex H. Woodle.)	Democratic	▌ ✓ Francis Nicholson	Incumbent did not seek re-election. New member elected. Democratic hold.
Horry	James P. Stevens	Democratic	▌ ✓ James P. Stevens; ▌G. Stanley Bryant; ▌Baylis Spivey	Incumbent re-elected.
Jasper	J. Foster Smith	Democratic	▌ ✓ Henry C. Walker; ▌J. Foster Smith; ▌W. J. Ellis	Incumbent lost renomination. New member elected. Democratic hold.
Laurens	Vacant (Note: Democrat Robert C. Wasson resigned to become a member of the state tax commission.)		▌ ✓ King Dixon Sr.; ▌W. C. Dobbins; ▌Justin A. Bridges	Incumbent did not seek re-election. New member elected. Democratic hold.
Lexington	James P. Stevens	Democratic	▌ ✓ Francis C. Jones; ▌Phillip K. Wingard; ▌Blease Ellison	Incumbent re-elected.
Marion	J. Marion Gasque	Democratic	▌ ✓ J. Marion Gasque; ▌T. Carroll Atkinson	Incumbent re-elected.
McCormick	L. L. Hester	Democratic	▌ ✓ L. L. Hester	Incumbent re-elected.
Newberry	R. Aubrey Harley	Democratic	▌ ✓ J. F. Hawkins; ▌Earl H. Bergen	Incumbent did not seek re-election. New member elected. Democratic hold.
Oconee	Marshall J. Parker	Democratic	▌ ✓ Marshall J. Parker	Incumbent re-elected.
Orangeburg	Marshall B. Williams	Democratic	▌ ✓ Marshall B. Williams	Incumbent re-elected.
Saluda	F. G. Scurry	Democratic	▌ ✓ F. G. Scurry	Incumbent re-elected.
Spartanburg	Charles C. Moore	Democratic	▌ ✓ Charles C. Moore	Incumbent re-elected.
York	Robert W. Hayes	Democratic	▌ ✓ Robert W. Hayes; ▌David Lyle	Incumbent re-elected.
