= 1962 South Carolina Senate election =

- November 6, 1962

24 of 46 seats in the South Carolina Senate (23 regular, 1 special) 24 seats needed for a majority
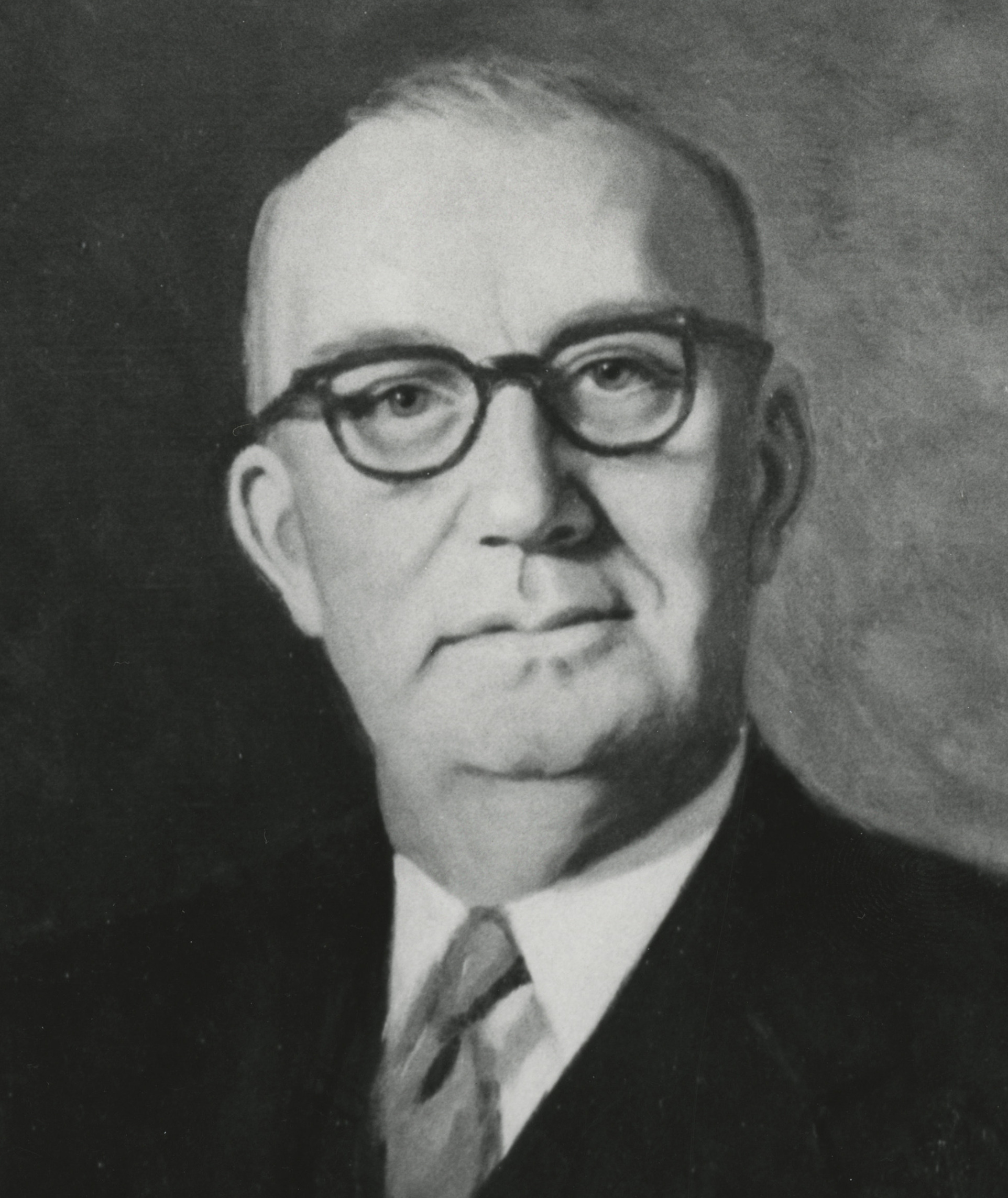

	Majority party	Minority party
Leader	Edgar Allan Brown	—
Party	Democratic	Republican
Leader since	1942	—
Leader's seat	Barnwell Co.	—
Last election	23 seats	Did not contest
Seats before	46	0
Seats won	24	0
Seats after	46	0
Popular vote	25,805 (Note: Excludes vote totals from uncontested seats)	13,857
Percentage	65.04%	34.92%
- District results New Democratic senator elected Democratic incumbent senator re-elected Asterisk (Georgetown Co.): Special election.
President before election
Edgar Allan Brown
Democratic
Elected President
Edgar Allan Brown
Democratic

An election in the U.S. state of South Carolina was held on November 6, 1962 to elect 24 of the South Carolina Senate's 46 members to four-year terms. Twenty-three seats were regularly scheduled, and one seat in Georgetown County was a special election triggered by the resignation of a member. Every seat up for election was won by the nominee of the Democratic Party. After not fielding any legislative candidates in the 1960 general election, Republicans contested two Senate seats, in Charleston County and Florence County. Both Republicans lost to Democrats, and the remaining 22 seats were noncompetitive. For most seats, the real contests were the Democratic primary elections, with a first round on June 12 and a runoff election on June 26.

Of the 23 senators up for re-election, three declined to seek another term, leaving four open seats when including the special election in Georgetown County. In the first round of the Democratic primary, twelve senators won renomination outright, seven of whom were unopposed. Six senators lost renomination outright, and two incumbent senators advanced to a runoff. Both lost renomination in the second round. The Democratic primaries resulted in a total of twelve new faces in the Senate. Longtime incumbent president pro tempore Edgar Allan Brown was re-elected to his post at the beginning of the new legislative session on Tuesday, January 8, 1963.

The elections were held concurrently with those for U.S. Senate, U.S. House, governor, state house, and numerous other state and local elections.

== Overview ==
County	Incumbents		Candidates	Result
County	Senator	Party	Candidates	Result
Abbeville	Walton M. Stephens	Democratic	▌ ✓ Addison B. Carwile; ▌Walton M. Stephens	Incumbent lost renomination. New member elected. Democratic hold.
Allendale	W. Edwin Myrick	Democratic	▌ ✓ W. Edwin Myrick; ▌A. P. Williams	Incumbent re-elected.
Anderson	John C. Taylor	Democratic	Democratic runoff: ▌ ✓ J. B. Lawson: 5,348 votes, 61.20%; ▌John C. Taylor: 3,391 votes, 38.80%; Democratic primary: ▌ John C. Taylor; ▌ J. B. Lawson; ▌David L. Freeman; ▌John C. Pracht; ▌Francis M. Prince; ▌Charles Welborn	Incumbent lost renomination. New member elected. Democratic hold.
Berkeley	Rembert C. Dennis	Democratic	▌ ✓ Rembert C. Dennis	Incumbent re-elected.
Charleston	T. Allen Legare	Democratic	General election: ▌ ✓ T. Allen Legare (Democratic) 18,736 votes, 62.49%; ▌Arthur Ravenel Jr. (Republican) 11,246 votes, 37.51%; Democratic primary: ▌ ✓ T. Allen Legare	Incumbent re-elected.
Cherokee	George W. McKown	Democratic	▌ ✓ George W. McKown; ▌W. C. Hamrick Jr.; ▌Jack E. Millwood	Incumbent re-elected.
Chester	Wilbur G. Grant	Democratic	▌ ✓ Wilbur G. Grant; ▌Joe W. Collins	Incumbent re-elected.
Chesterfield	Paul Arant	Democratic	▌ ✓ Edward M. Leppard; ▌Paul Arant; ▌J. F. Rickenback Jr.	Incumbent lost renomination. New member elected. Democratic hold.
Clarendon	John William Green	Democratic	▌ ✓ James M. Morris; ▌John William Green	Incumbent lost renomination. New member elected. Democratic hold.
Colleton	I. A. Smoak Jr.	Democratic	Democratic runoff: ▌ ✓ J. P. Harrelson: 2,781 votes, 51.32%; ▌Isadore Bogoslow: 2,638 votes, 48.68%; Democratic primary: ▌ J. P. Harrelson; ▌ Isadore Bogoslow; ▌E. H. O'Keefe; ▌H. Wayne Unger; ▌Ray Daugherty	Incumbent did not seek re-election. New member elected. Democratic hold.
Darlington	James P. Mozingo III	Democratic	▌ ✓ James P. Mozingo III	Incumbent re-elected.
Dillon	Dixon D. Lee	Democratic	Democratic runoff: ▌ ✓ Roger W. Scott: 2,533 votes, 51.55%; ▌Dixon D. Lee: 2,381 votes, 48.45%; Democratic primary: ▌ Dixon D. Lee; ▌ Roger W. Scott; ▌Charles G. Allen	Incumbent lost renomination. New member elected. Democratic hold.
Florence	W. Clyde Graham	Democratic	General election: ▌ ✓ W. Clyde Graham (Democratic) 7,069 votes, 72.91%; ▌Robert G. Knight (Republican) 2,611 votes, 26.93%; ▌ Write-ins: 16 votes, 0.17%; Democratic primary: ▌ ✓ W. Clyde Graham; ▌E. N. Zeigler	Incumbent re-elected.
Georgetown (special)	Vacant (Note: Seat previously held by Democrat James B. Morrison, who resigned to take a circuit judgeship)		▌ ✓ C. Claymon Grimes; ▌V. C. Haselden	Incumbent resigned. New member elected. Democratic hold.
Hampton	J. Morrison Tuten	Democratic	Democratic runoff: ▌ ✓ Grover F. Bowers: 1,620 votes, 54.00%; ▌Winston A. Lawton: 1,380, 46.00%; Democratic primary: ▌ Grover F. Bowers; ▌ Winston A. Lawton; ▌Hugh T. Lightsey	Incumbent did not seek re-election. New member elected. Democratic hold.
Kershaw	John C. West	Democratic	▌ ✓ John C. West	Incumbent re-elected.
Lancaster	W. Bruce Williams	Democratic	▌ ✓ Frank L. Roddey; ▌W. Bruce Williams	Incumbent lost renomination. New member elected. Democratic hold.
Lee	Ed B. Baskin	Democratic	▌ ✓ William G. DesChamps; ▌Ed B. Baskin	Incumbent lost renomination. New member elected. Democratic hold.
Marlboro	William C. Goldberg	Democratic	▌F. Marion Hinson; ▌ ✓ Jack Lindsey	Incumbent did not seek re-election. New member elected. Democratic hold.
Pickens	Earle Morris	Democratic	▌ ✓ Earle Morris	Incumbent re-elected.
Richland	Walter J. Bristow	Democratic	▌ ✓ Walter J. Bristow; ▌J. Carlisle Oxner	Incumbent re-elected.
Sumter	Henry B. Richardson	Democratic	▌ ✓ Henry B. Richardson	Incumbent re-elected.
Union	John D. Long	Democratic	▌ ✓ John D. Long	Incumbent re-elected.
Williamsburg	V. G. Arnette	Democratic	▌ ✓ W. Frank Mishoe; ▌V. G. Arnette; ▌Lanue Floyd	Incumbent lost renomination. New member elected. Democratic hold.
