= Club Atenas =

Former social club in Havana, Cuba

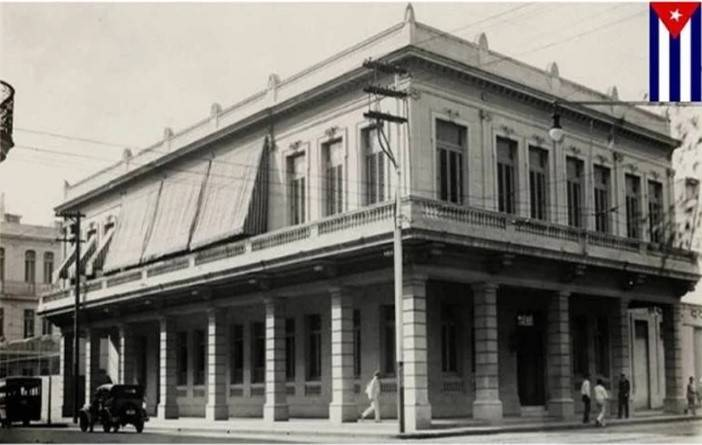

General information
- Location: Havana, La Habana Province, Cuba
- Opened: 1917

Design and construction
- Architect: Luís Delfín Valdés

Club Atenas was the best-known and most elite Afro-Cuban social club in Havana, Cuba.

== Early history ==
Club Atenas was established in 1917 in Havana, Cuba. The club was built by Luís Delfín Valdés, a Cuban architect.

It was established by Havana's Black elites, with 68 lawyers, engineers, civil officers, and teachers among its founding members. Pantaleón Julian Valdés was the first elected president.

Apart from organizing dances and cultural events, it also planned travels both domestically and internationally. One such trip took place in 1954, when the U.S. former First Lady Eleanor Roosevelt was given a bust of Cuban patriot Antonio Maceo. Black Americans Langston Hughes, W.E.B. Du Bois, and Mary Bethune were among the guests received by the club.

Following the Cuban Revolution, the Castro government seized Club Atenas in 1961 and converted the building into a daycare center.
