= Pantaleón Julian Valdés =

Cuban medical doctor

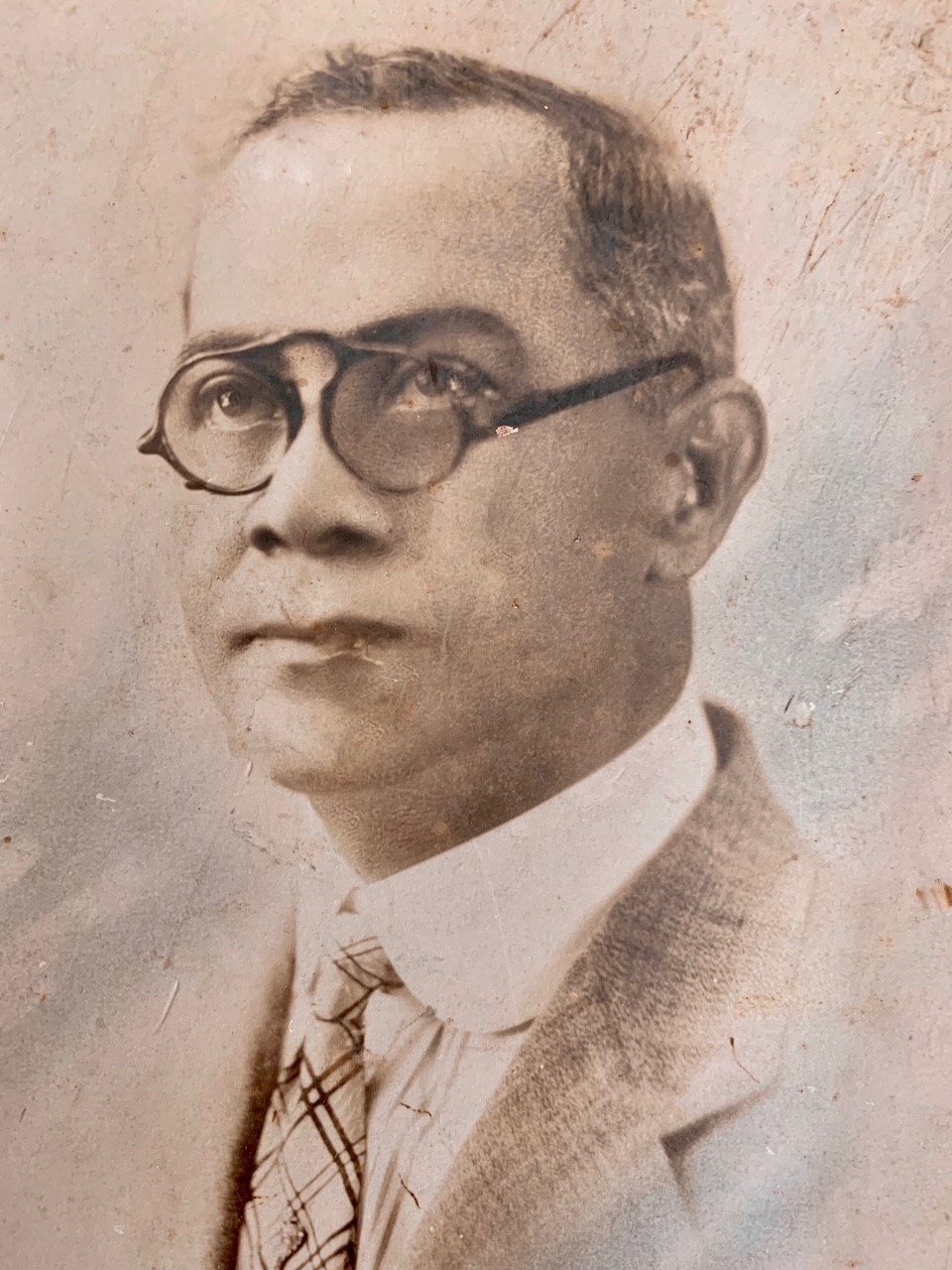
- Born: Cuba
- Died: La Habana, Cuba
- Education: Universidad of La Habana, Universitat Autonoma de Barcelona
- Known for: First President of the Club Atenas (1917-1918), Afro-Cuban civil and political rights leader
- Political party: Partido Independiente de Color de Cuba, Partido Liberal de Cuba
- Spouse(s): Ana Coscojuela, Julia Cervantes
- Children: 2, including Maria Teresa Valdés Coscojuela (Tete)

Pantaleón Julian Valdés was a Cuban medical doctor, an activist of civil and political rights for black and mulatos in Cuba and a prominent voice for the Afro-Cuban intellectual elite. In 1917, Valdés became the first elected president of the “Club Atenas” a major twentieth-century Afro Cuban cultural and social center. Pantaleón Julian Valdés was a member of the Partido Independiente de Color (PIC) and he was arrested with other Independents in 1910 and 1912. Later, when some prominent ex-members of the PIC were reincorporated into the political machinery, he was elected to the Havana Board of Education with the support of the Partido Liberal.

After his tenure as president of Club Atenas, Pantaleón J. Valdés continued his political journey as a representative of the Camara for the Conservative Party in 1920.

== Education and studies abroad ==
Pantaleón J. Valdés had the benefit of receiving additional education outside of Cuba. After completing medical studies at the University of La Habana with an obstetrician specialization, Valdés did postgraduate studies at the Universitat Autonoma of Barcelona during 1888 - 1889. His medical practice was located in the Calle (street) Reina 110, La Habana and he was a follower of natural therapy methods.

His brother Luis Delfín Valdés received his education in America. He arrived at Tuskegee University with one of the first groups of Afro-Cuban students in 1899 and graduated of Tuskegee in 1908. This was a result of Booker T. Washington's efforts to enroll Afro Cubans in Tuskegee College in Alabama, especially in architecture. Drawing from research conducted in the Booker T. Washington Papers in the Library of Congress and the Tuskegee University Archives, this paper highlights the ways Tuskegee became a place where largely disconnected Afro-diasporic populations came together at the turn of the twentieth century. After graduation, he returned to Cuba and established a successful career as an architect becoming the architect of the Club Atenas, the most prominent Afro-Cuban society on the island before Castro.

A photo from 1908 shows students of the Afro-diaspora from different nationalities that attended Tuskegee. Left to right and back to front: 1. Sierra Feijoo Saturnino of San Juan, Puerto Rico; 2. Edward Andreas Anthony of Lome Togo, West Coast Africa; 3. Bethuel Aldrick Pusey of St. Andrews Island, Central America; 4. Alvin Joseph Neely of Newberry, South Carolina; 5. Malcolm Iwane Kawahara of Saga Shi, Japan; 6. Alexander Lavaud of Port-au-Prince, Hayti (sic); 7. Luis Delfin Valdes of Havana, Cuba.

== The Club Atenas ==
Pantaleón J. Valdés was one of the founding members of the Club Atenas and its first elected President from 1917 to 1918 in La Habana. The Club Atenas was the most exclusive and aristocratic society for the black and mulatos and was the most influential civic and cultural organization of its kind in Cuba.

The institution was established at general meeting with its founding members on September 21, 1917, at the General Lauzá industrial estate, located at Escobar Street No. 78. According to the archives from the Revista Atenas. Órgano de la Sociedad "Club Atenas" from 1931, the board of directors was formed and Pantaleón Julian Valdés was elected as the first president. The other serving members included: first vice President Juan Canales Carozo, second vice president Leoncio Morúa Delgado, secretary Ramón María Valdés, vice secretary Ludovico S. Barceló, treasurer Laureano Suazo, vice treasurer Ermenegildo Couvert, Vocales Genaro Lauza Lauza, Coronel José Calvez, Antero Valdés Espada, Juan M. Herrera, Policarpo Madrigal, Lino D'Ou Ayllón, Pablo Herrera, Ramiro N.Cuesta Rendón, José Carlos Valdés, Belisario Hesureaux, and Ing. Ramón M. Edreira.

As the president, Pantaleón J. Valdés gave the opening speech during the inauguration alongside the member of honor Juan Gualberto Gómez, an Afro-Cuban revolutionary leader who became senator in 1919.

The Club Atenas was the most well-known society of color on the island and a place where the black and mulato professional elite met to discuss progressing social thoughts. The club became a destination for international visitors and prominent members of the African American diaspora including the American writer Langston Hughes who visited the club in 1931 and Mary McLeod Bethune, founder of the Black Bethune-Cookman University who visited the club in 1930. Langston Hughes visited the Club Atenas in 1931 and took photos of the members and the facilities. Pantaleón J. Valdés was pictured on the photo from the basketball members of the Club Atenas where he is standing first in line with the ball in a photo currently located at the Beinecke library at Yale University.

The Club Atenas was initially located in Calle San Miguel Nº 119 (high) in Havana. In 1925, as president Gerardo Machado, as recorded in the National Archives of Cuba, ceded and transferred in favor of this institution the lot No. 5 of block No. 22, of the grounds of the old Wall, to build the building suitable for the domicile of this Club. In addition, they were awarded fifty thousand pesos for their construction. Later in February 1927 a construction of a new building began according to the project of the architect Luis Delfín Valdés. The building was finished the 11 of May 1929 and was located in the streets Ignacio Agramonte and Apodaca, opening with a reception in which the president of the republic and celebrating in the evening a great ball for members.

== Personal life and family ==
Pantaleón J. Valdés married twice. He met his first wife Ana Coscojuela in Spain and together they traveled to La Habana where she later died from tuberculosis. They had a daughter Maria Teresa Valdés Coscojuela (Tete) and a son. Valdés believed in the importance of college education for his children and sent his daughter Tete to study to college in Boston, Massachusetts, US.

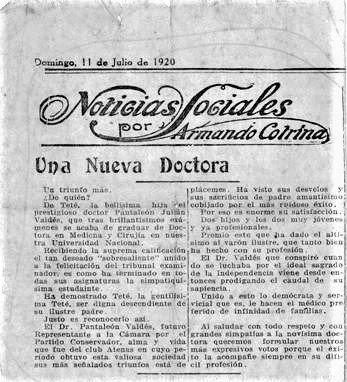
Noticias Sociales and the daughter of Pantaleón J. Valdés, 1920

Once Maria Teresa Valdés Coscojuela returned to Cuba, she studied Medicine and Surgery at Universidad of La Habana and graduated in July 1920. After graduation, she practiced medicine as a surgeon obstetrician in partnership with her husband. At the time when few women attended university and a medical degree was a field reserved for males, Maria Teresa together with Francisca Rivero Arocha (Panchita) and Dulce Esperanza Martinez (Franque) reached a remarkable achievement and became the first three females to receive a medical degree from the University of La Habana.

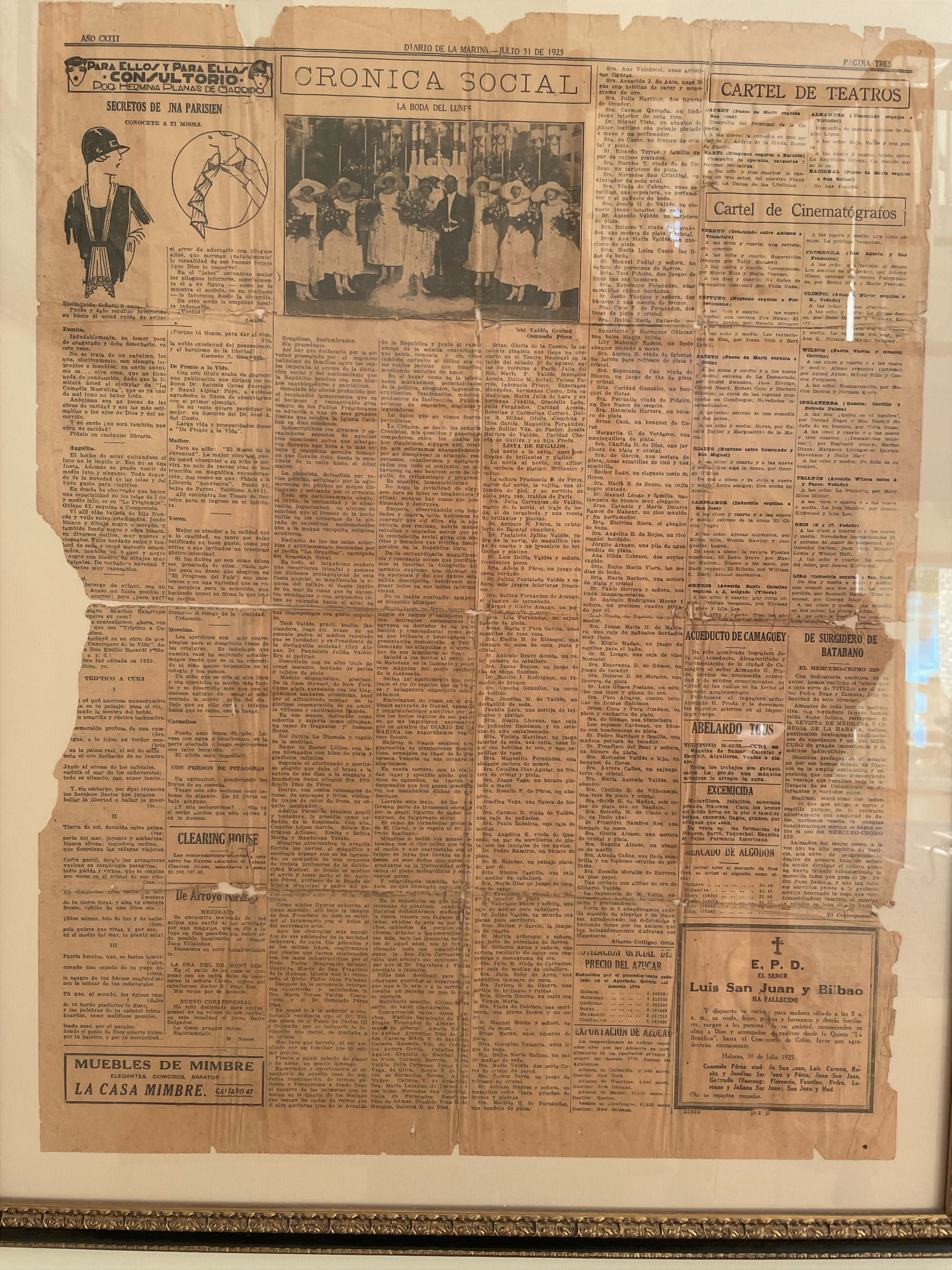
Diario de La Marina, La Habana, Cuba, Julio 31, 1925

On July 31, 1925, Maria Teresa Valdés Coscojuela married Osmudo Perez Diaz and they had two children, their first daughter Noemi Noemí Pérez Valdés (Mimi) and her younger brother Osmundo Pérez Valdés.

Pantaleón J. Valdés remarried and his second wife was Julia Cervantes. In 1925 the couple lived in Avenida Carlos III and Oquendo close to the then-fabulous Quinta de Los Molinos where they hosted the wedding reception for Maria Teresa and (Pedro) Osmundo. The ceremony was featured in the July 31, 1925 issue of Diario de Marina, Cuba's leading newspaper before 1959. As a little girl Mimi lived in her grandfather's beautiful house and he also instilled in his granddaughter a passion for pursuing higher education.

According to the memories of his granddaughter Noemí Pérez Valdés, Pantaleón J. Valdés died from an untreated gangrene caused by a child who bit his finger during a clinical exam. He was buried in the Colon Cemetery of La Habana.
