= Statue of Mary McLeod Bethune (U.S. Capitol) =

Statue by Nilda M. Comas

Mary McLeod Bethune
- Artist: Nilda M. Comas
- Year: 2022
- Medium: Marble sculpture
- Subject: Mary McLeod Bethune
- Dimensions: (11 feet (including pedestal) in)
- Weight: 6,129 lbs
- Location: Washington, D.C., United States

Nilda Comas sculpting Mary McLeod Bethune out of clay for a marble statue to be installed in Statuary Hall in Washington D.C.

The statue honoring civil rights and women's rights activist Mary McLeod Bethune was unveiled in the United States Capitol in Washington, D.C., representing Florida in the National Statuary Hall Collection on July 13, 2022. This makes her the first black American represented in the National Statuary Hall Collection.

The statue is made of Italian Carrara marble and was carved by Nilda M. Comas in Pietrasanta, Italy. The marble came from the same Tuscan quarry used by Michelangelo to carve David. The completed statue weighs 3 tons and measures 11 feet tall, including the base.

Master sculptor, Comas, is the first artist of Puerto Rican descent to be commissioned to contribute to the National Statuary Hall Collection. She was the artist selected out of a pool of 1,600. She worked from her studios in Ft. Lauderdale, Florida and Pietrasanta, Italy, and she traveled to Mayesville, South Carolina--Dr. Bethune's hometown--to research the life and personality of her subject.

In addition to conveying a likeness, the statue represents symbols of Dr. Bethune's life and legacy. Dr. Bethune is clad in cap and gown to represent her lifelong devotion to education. Comas sculpted the rose from a Spanish black marble. The token commemorates Dr. Bethune's visit to a multi-colored rose garden, in which she envisioned the possibility of racial harmony and the value of diversity to individuals and society alike. The base of the statue serves to balance the weight of the statue as a whole and was carved into forms of large books, the words on the spines are the actual words of Dr. Bethune's last will and testament, "I leave you love, hope, faith, racial dignity, a thirst for education, courage and peace." The statue's cane represents a cherished cane that Dr. Bethune once leaned upon, a cane that President Franklin Roosevelt had possessed and gifted to her through her friend, Eleanor Roosevelt. Finally, the statue's base is inscribed with a quote from Dr. Bethune: "Invest in the human soul. Who knows, it may be a diamond in the rough."

The statue replaced Confederate General Edmund Kirby Smith's statue as one of Florida's two offerings to the collection.

== See also ==
- Mary McLeod Bethune Memorial
- Statue of Mary McLeod Bethune (Jersey City)
