= Euphradian Society =

Literary society at the University of South Carolina, US

- ΦΑΕ
- Founded: February 1806; 220 years ago–1862; 1866–1873; 1882-1986; 2010; University of South Carolina
- Type: Literary
- Affiliation: Independent
- Status: Active
- Emphasis: debate
- Scope: Local
- Chapters: 1
- Alternative name: Phi Alpha Epsilon
- Headquarters: Columbia, South Carolina; United States

The Euphradian Society, also known as Phi Alpha Epsilon (ΦΑΕ), is a collegiate debating and literary society founded in 1806 at the University of South Carolina, then known as South Carolina College.

== History ==
The Euphradian Society was formed as a result of the division of the Philomathic Society, which formed within weeks of the opening of the college in 1805 and included virtually all enrolled students. At the Synapian Convention in February 1806, the members of Philomathic decided to split into separate societies, one of which became known as Euphradian Society, while the other became known as Clariosophic Society. A coin toss decided which society the formed members of Philomathic joined. Later, students entered a society based on their home county.

The Euphradian Society was also known as Phi Alpha Epsilon. The minutes of the society have been lost, so little is known about the selection of its name. Its first president was William Harper. Other officers included vice president, secretary, treasurer, recorder, and four critics. It was incorporated by the South Carolina legislature on December 20, 1820, as "The Euphradian Society".

The society ceased operations on February 25, 1862, because of the Civil War. After the war, alumni and honorary members restarted the Euphradian Society on January 13, 1866. Alumnus Robert W. Shand served as its president until student officers were installed on March 31. However, the financial problems in the South after the war negatively impacted the society and it did not achieve its pre-war success.

During the political unrest of the 1870s, the society went inactive and a group called the Lambda Delta Epsilon committee, consisting of four members and three honorary members, was given authority to act on behalf of the Eurphradian Society and were tasked with protecting the society's documents, to sell its furniture if necessary and, fearing the admission of free African American to the college, to "keep negros from becoming members". A member of the Lambda Delta Epsilon committee, Colonel Fitz W. McMaster, secured and removed the society's records and constitution, fearing that their contents could be used by the post-war government to sully the name of the society.

McMaster tried unsuccessfully to restart the society over nine years. Instead, the Ciceronian Society emerged and took possession of some of the rooms in Harper College. The Euphradian's library had losses and vandalism during this time. However, after one year, rules were placed on campus that better protected the society's old and rare book collection. McMaster successfully reorganized the society on February 19, 1882.

However, in the 1970s the society became inactive. Its space in Harper College was renamed the Gressette Room after Marion Gressette, a deceased society member and state politician. In 2010, the Euphradian Society was re-established by its alumni.

== Symbols and traditions ==
The society's name, Euphradian, means "eloquence" or "correctness of speech". It adopted a mystic stand in 1815.

Its badge was a six-pointed star, decorated with the Greek letters ΦΑΕ, the year 1806, and the motto "Amicitiae Sacrum". The society also had a key, made in gold, that featured a central illustration of clasping hands, with the name, Euphradian Society, and the motto "Amicitiae Sacrum" below.

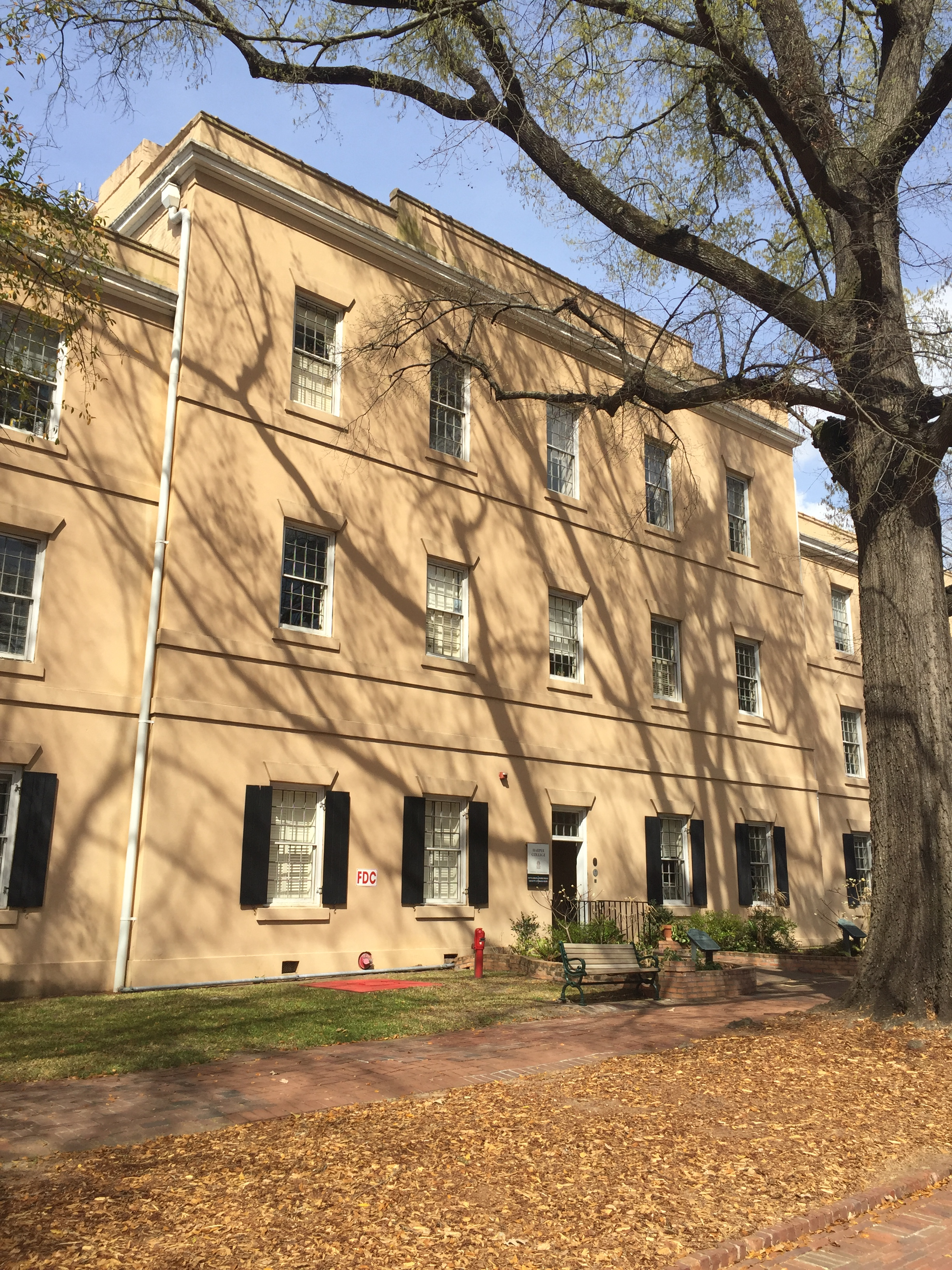
Harper College

== Society hall ==
Initially, the society met in the College Chapel. In 1820, it secured rooms on the third floor of DeSaussure College. In addition to providing a meeting space, the society's hall held its library collection.

After the 1848 campus expansion, college trustees gave the society space on the third floor of Harper College. The society decorated this newly constructed space which was dedicated on December 7, 1848. Member and professor James H. Thornwell gave the address. One visitor to the space noted, "The hall was then newly furnished and equipped and presented a beautiful, attractive, brilliant, and imposing appearance. The impression upon a boy from the backcountry upon beholding the gaudy and dazzling spectacle on being conducted into the hall was simply overwhelming."

== Activities ==
The Euphradian Society met on Saturday nights after supper. These meetings included at least one formal debate, with topics being assigned two weeks in advance. In addition, one member was selected as an orator and would deliver a full-length address each month. Their debates with the other campus societies covered political, religious, and social issues of the day, including the issue of slavery in 1826, 1827, and 1852.

== Notable members ==
- Richard H. Anderson (Honorary) – General in the Confederate States Army
- Robert Woodward Barnwell – United States Senate and Confederate States of America Senate
- William H. Brawley – United States representative and United States district judge
- Theodorus W. Brevard – Florida Comptroller and judge
- John Campbell – United States House of Representatives
- James Henry Carlisle – President of Wofford College
- M. E. Carn – Lieutenant Governor of South Carolina
- James Ronald Chalmers – United States House of Representatives
- William F. Colcock – United States House of Representative
- George W. Dargan – United States House of Representatives
- Josiah J. Evans – United States Senator and judges
- John B. Floyd – Governor of Virginia and U.S. Secretary of War
- Nathan Bedford Forrest (Honorary) – General in the Confederate States Army and founding member, as well as first Grand Wizard of the Reconstruction-era Ku Klux Klan
- William Alexander Graham – Governor of North Carolina and United States Senate
- Marion Gressette – politician
- James H. Hammond – Governor of South Carolina, United States Senate, and United States House of Representative
- William Harper – United States Senate
- Isaac W. Hayne – Attorney General of South Carolina
- Henry Washington Hilliard – United States House of Representative and general in the Confederate States Army
- Robert E. Lee (Honorary) – General in Chief of the Armies of the Confederate States
- Stephen D. Lee (Honorary) – Lieutenant general in the Confederate States Army
- Francis Lieber – jurist and academic (Note: On October 25, 1860, the society held a special meeting to remove Lieber from its membership because he supported abolition. Its members also removed his portrait and bust from their hall.)
- John Lawrence Manning – Governor of South Carolina
- Henry McIver – chief justice on the South Carolina Supreme Court
- James Rion McKissick – journalist, lawyer, and president of the University of South Carolina
- William McWillie – Governor of Mississippi and United States House of Representative
- Stephen D. Miller – Governor of South Carolina, United States Senate, and United States House of Representative
- Franklin J. Moses Sr. (Honorary) – Chief Justice of South Carolina and politician (Note: The society expelled him for being "false to his own race" in April 1868.)
- Gilbert du Motier, Marquis de Lafayette (Honorary) – French general and politician
- John Murphy – United States House of Representative
- Madison S. Perry – Governor of Florida
- William C. Preston – United States Senate and president of the University of South Carolina
- John Peter Richardson II – Governor of South Carolina and United States House of Representative
- Thomas J. Robertson (Honorary) – United States Senate
- Charltes Henry Simonton – United States circuit judge
- J. Marion Sims – pioneer surgeon
- James Henley Thornwell – theologian and academic
- Samuel W. Trotti – United States House of Representative
- John A. Wharton – lawyer and Confederate General
- Samuel Williamson – President of Davidson College
- Thomas Jefferson Withers – politician and circuit judge
- Isaac Donnom Witherspoon – Lieutenant Governor of South Carolina
