= Mary McLeod Bethune =

American educator and civil rights leader (1875–1955)

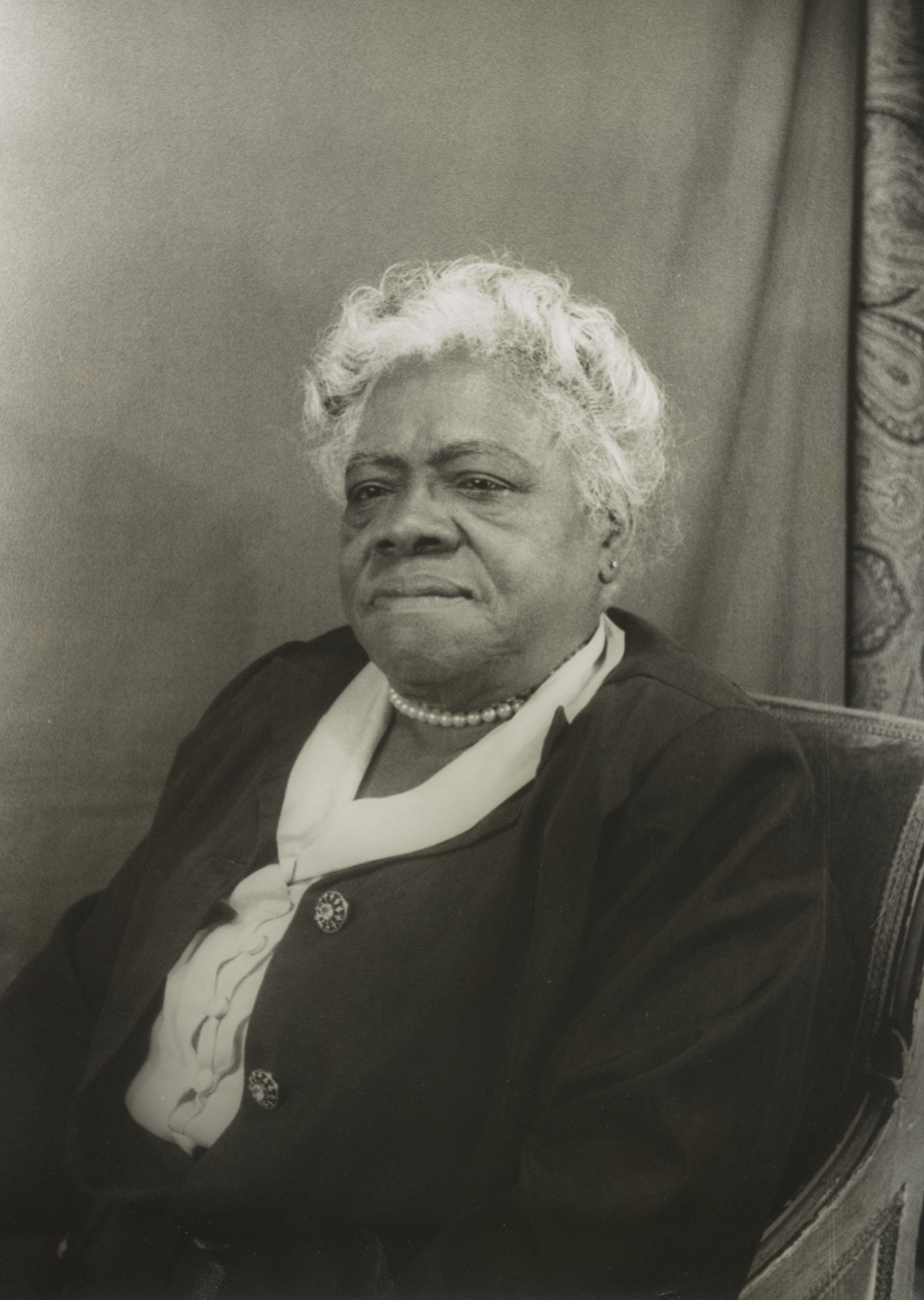
- 1949 portrait
- Born: Mary Jane McLeod; July 10, 1875; Mayesville, South Carolina, U.S.
- Died: May 18, 1955 (aged 79); Daytona Beach, Florida, U.S.
- Occupations: Educator; philanthropist; humanitarian; civil rights activist
- Spouse: Albertus Bethune (m. 1898; sep. 1907)
- Children: 1

Mary McLeod Bethune (née McLeod; July 10, 1875 – May 18, 1955) was an American educator, philanthropist, humanitarian, womanist, and civil rights activist. Bethune founded the National Council of Negro Women in 1935, and proceeded to establish the Aframerican Women's Journal, which was the flagship journal of the organization. She presided over other Black American women's organizations, including the National Association for Colored Women. Shortly after joining the National Youth Administration in 1935, Bethune became the first Black woman to lead a federal agency when she was appointed by President Franklin D. Roosevelt as the head of a department within the NYA.

She started a private school for Black American students which later became Bethune-Cookman University. She was the only Black American woman to hold an official position with the US delegation that created the United Nations charter. McLeod also held a leadership position for the American Women's Voluntary Services, which was founded by Alice Throckmorton McLean. Bethune wrote prolifically, publishing in several periodicals from 1924 to 1955.

After working on the presidential campaign for Franklin Roosevelt in 1932, she was appointed as a national advisor and worked with Roosevelt to create the Federal Council on Colored Affairs, also known as the Black Cabinet. Honors include the designation of her home in Daytona Beach, Florida, as a National Historic Landmark and a 1974 statue as "the first monument to honor a Black American and a woman in a public park in Washington, D.C."

== Early life and education ==
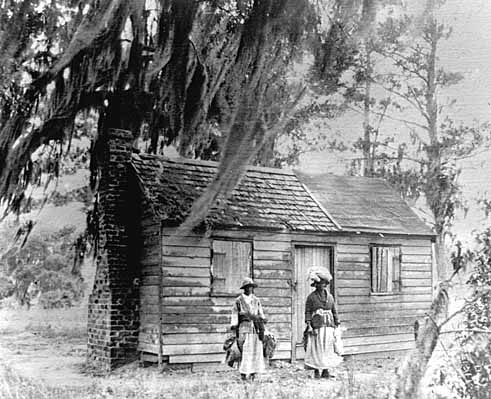
The cabin in Mayesville, South Carolina, where Mary Jane McLeod was born

Mary Jane McLeod was born on July 10, 1875, in a small log cabin near Mayesville, South Carolina, on a rice and cotton farm in Sumter County. She was the fifteenth of seventeen children born to Sam and Patsy (née McIntosh) McLeod, both former slaves. Patsy McLeod worked after emancipation for her former owner, earning enough to buy five acres (2.0 ha) from him. (Note: Historian Joyce A. Hanson describes this sale as "unusual", since many White landowners in the area had formed compacts to avoid selling land to Black people.) There, Sam and their sons built the log cabin in which McLeod was born. McLeod grew up hearing stories from her maternal grandmother, Sophie, about resistance to slavery, and both Sophie and Patsy told McLeod that she was special. McLeod credited them both with inspiring her work toward equality.

McLeod recalled noticing racial inequality as a child, observing that the Black community had access to less material wealth and opportunity. She particularly remembered visiting the home of the Wilson's—the family that had enslaved her mother—where she explored a play house while Patsy worked. McLeod picked up a book, and one of the Wilson girls admonished her with "Put down that book, you can't read." McLeod later cited the incident as contributing to her desire for literacy and education.

When she was twelve, McLeod saw a white mob attack and nearly hang a Black man. The man had refused to blow a match out for a White man and then had shoved him to the ground. As McLeod watched, the mob nearly hung the Black man, stopped at the last moment by the sheriff. McLeod recalled later learning about both the terrifying effects of white violence and the value of allying with some white people, those she called "calm men of authority".

In October 1886, McLeod began attending Mayesville's one-room Black schoolhouse, Trinity Mission School, which was run by the Presbyterian Board of Missions of Freedmen and founded by Emma Jane Wilson. The school was five miles (8.0 km) from her home, and she walked there and back. Not all her siblings attended, so she taught her family what she had learned each day. In addition to founding the school, Wilson was McLeod's teacher, and became a significant mentor in her life.

Wilson had attended Scotia Seminary (now Barber–Scotia College). She helped McLeod attend the same school on a scholarship, which McLeod did from 1888 to 1894. She attended Dwight L. Moody's Institute for Home and Foreign Missions in Chicago (now the Moody Bible Institute) from 1894 to 1895. McLeod applied to be a missionary with the Presbyterian Board of Missions, with the goal of becoming a missionary in Africa. Although her request was denied, McLeod found a new use for the skills she had learned by teaching at Haines Institute in Augusta, Georgia.

== Marriage and family ==
McLeod married Albertus Bethune in 1898. The Bethunes moved to Savannah, Georgia, where she did social work until they moved to Florida. They had a son named Albert McLeod Bethune Sr. A visiting Presbyterian minister, Coyden Harold Uggams, persuaded the couple to relocate to Palatka, Florida, to run a mission school. The Bethunes moved in 1899; Mary ran the mission school and began an outreach to prisoners. Albertus left the family in 1907 and relocated to South Carolina. The couple never divorced, and Albertus died in 1918 from tuberculosis.

== Teaching career ==
=== Foundations with Lucy Craft Laney ===
Bethune worked as a teacher briefly at her former school in Sumter County. In 1896, she began teaching at Haines Normal and Industrial Institute in Augusta, Georgia, which was part of a Presbyterian mission organized by northern congregations. It was founded and run by Lucy Craft Laney, who was a Christian missionary and the daughter of former slaves. Laney ran her school with a Christian missionary zeal, emphasizing character and practical education for boys and girls who showed up eager to learn. Laney's mission was to imbue Christian moral education in her students to arm them for their life challenges. Of her year at Laney's school, Bethune said:

I was so impressed with her fearlessness, her amazing touch in every respect, an energy that seemed inexhaustible and her mighty power to command respect and admiration from her students and all who knew her. She handled her domain with the art of a master.

Bethune adopted many of Laney's educational philosophies, including her emphasis on educating girls and women to improve the conditions of Black people; Bethune's approach added a focus on political activism. After one year at Haines, Bethune was transferred by the Presbyterian mission to the Kindell Institute in Sumter, South Carolina, where she met her husband.

=== School in Daytona ===
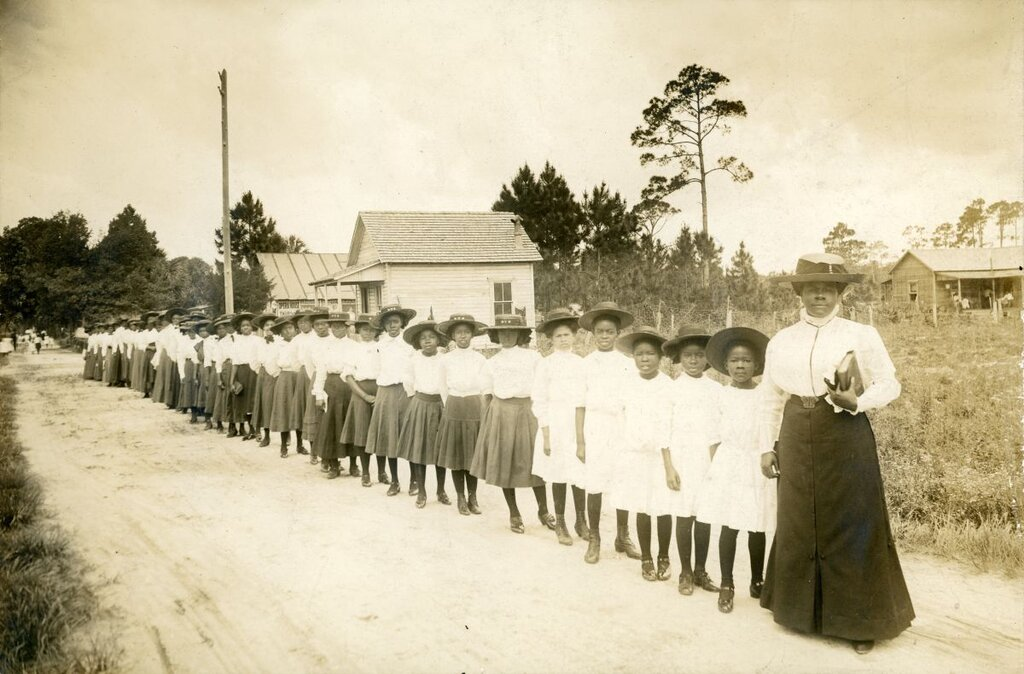
Bethune with girls from her Daytona school, c. 1905

After getting married and moving to Florida, Bethune became determined to start a school for girls. Bethune moved from Palatka to Daytona because it had more economic opportunity; it had become a popular tourist destination, and businesses were thriving. In October 1904, she rented a small house for $11.00 per month. She made benches and desks from discarded crates and acquired other items through charity. Bethune started the Educational and Industrial Training School for Negro Girls in 1904. She initially had six students—five girls and her son Albert. At this stage, tuition was 50 cents. The school bordered Daytona's dump. She raised money by selling homemade sweet potato pies and ice cream to crews of local workers, gathering enough to purchase additional dump land. She hired workers to build the brick building Faith Hall, paying them in part with free tuition. By 1918, Faith Hall was completed along with an additional two-story building and an auditorium. Later, McLeod had another building constructed further from the campus to educate boys who came to the school.

In the early days of her school, the students made ink for pens from elderberry juice and pencils from burned wood; they asked local businesses for furniture. Bethune wrote later, "I considered cash money as the smallest part of my resources. I had faith in a loving God, faith in myself, and a desire to serve." The school received donations of money, equipment, and labor from local Black churches. Within a year, Bethune was teaching more than 30 girls at the school. After two years of operation, 250 girls were enrolled.

Bethune also courted wealthy White organizations, such as the ladies' Palmetto Club. She invited influential White men to sit on her school board of trustees, gaining participation by James Gamble (of Procter & Gamble), Ransom Eli Olds (of Oldsmobile and REO MotorCompany) and Thomas H. White (of White Sewing Machines). When Booker T. Washington of the Tuskegee Institute visited in 1912, he advised her of the importance of gaining support from white benefactors for funding, suggesting a few ways of doing so.

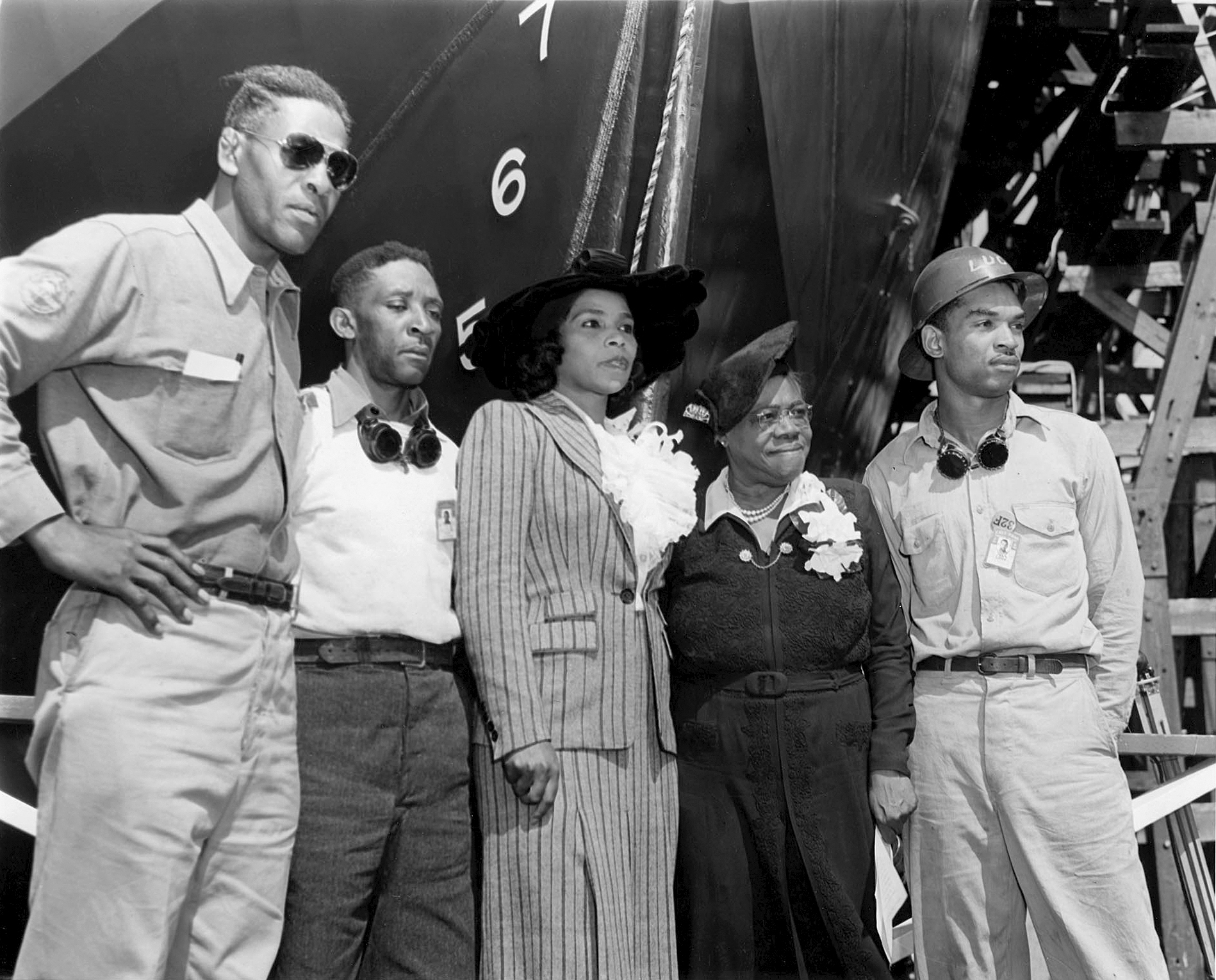
Bethune and Marian Anderson, celebrated contralto, at the launching of the SS Booker T. Washington

The rigorous curriculum had the girls rise at 5:30 a.m. for Bible study. Some of the classes in their schedules contained, in home economics and industrial skills such as dressmaking, millinery, cooking, and other crafts emphasized a life of self-sufficiency. Students' days ended at 9 p.m. Soon Bethune added science and business courses, then high school-level math, English, and foreign languages. Bethune always sought donations to keep her school operating, and would extend offers to wealthy white philanthropists to sit on the board in order to gain favor with them. Bethune also used her skills as a baker in order to raise money. Her friendship with Franklin and Eleanor Roosevelt assisted her in making connections. One of Bethune's more generous donors was John D. Rockefeller, who reportedly provided a donation of $62,000.

Beginning in 1923, Daytona School merged with the coeducational Cookman Institute; run by the Methodist church, the institute was the first Black college in Florida. Bethune became president, at a time when Black women rarely headed colleges. The merger completed in 1925 and formed Daytona Cookman Collegiate Institute, a coeducational junior college. Through the Great Depression, the school, renamed Bethune-Cookman College in 1931, continued to operate and met the educational standards of the State of Florida. Throughout the 1930s, Bethune and civil rights advocate Blake R. Van Leer worked with fellow Florida institutions to lobby for federal funding.

From 1936 to 1942, Bethune had to cut back her time as president because of her duties in Washington, D.C. Funding declined during this period of her absence. Nevertheless, by 1941, the college had developed a four-year curriculum and achieved full college status. By 1942, Bethune gave up the presidency, as her health was adversely affected by her many responsibilities. On September 19, 1942, she gave the address at the Los Angeles, California, launching ceremony for the Liberty ship Booker T. Washington, a ceremony in which Marian Anderson christened the ship.

== Impact on Daytona Beach community ==
In the early 1900s, Daytona Beach did not contain a hospital that would take in Black people, no matter the situation. Bethune had the idea to start a hospital after one of her students got appendicitis and was initially refused treatment at the local hospital. Bethune convinced the doctors to treat her student and left determined to open a hospital.

She found a cabin near the school, and through sponsors helping her raise money, she purchased it for five thousand dollars. In 1911, Bethune opened the first Black hospital in Daytona Beach, naming it McLeod Hospital after her parents. It started with two beds and, within a few years, held twenty. (Note: According to research by historian Sheila Flemming, in one year of operation the hospital "cared for 105 patients, had 316 outpatients, made 242 community calls and performed 24 operations".) Both White and Black physicians worked at the hospital, along with Bethune's student nurses. This hospital went on to save many Black lives within the twenty years that it operated.

During that time, both Black and White people in the community relied on help from McLeod Hospital. After an explosion at a nearby construction site, the hospital took in injured Black workers. The hospital and its nurses were also praised for their efforts with the 1918 influenza outbreak. During this outbreak, the hospital was full and had to overflow into the school's auditorium. In 1931, Daytona's public hospital, Halifax, agreed to open a separate hospital for people of color. Black people would not fully integrate into the public hospital's main location until the 1960s.

Bethune made Daytona School's library accessible to the public, it became Florida's first free library accessible to Black Floridians. She hosted a weekly story hour, which hundreds of children from the county attended, and ran a boys' club.

Concerned by a lack of affordable housing for Black people, Bethune leveraged her status as president to lobby for improved housing access. She was appointed to the city's housing board—becoming its only Black member—and she successfully pushed for a public housing project built near her school's campus.

== Career as a public leader ==
=== Suffrage activism ===
Mary McLeod Bethune joined the Equal Suffrage League, which was an organization branched off of The National Association of Colored Women in 1912. She was an advocate for voting equality, and though she could not yet vote, she was determined to change that for those in her community. After the passage of the Nineteenth Amendment, which enacted women's suffrage, Bethune continued her efforts to help Black people gain access to the polls. She solicited donations to help Black voters pay poll taxes, a fee voters paid to be eligible to cast their vote that was created to discriminate against Black Americans. She also provided tutoring for voter registration literacy tests, another discriminatory practice limiting Black Americans' ability to vote. This took place at her school, Daytona Normal and Industrial Institute. Finally, she planned and executed mass voter registration drives.

=== National Association of Colored Women ===
In 1896, the National Association of Colored Women (NACW) was formed to promote the needs of Black women. Bethune served as the Florida chapter president of the NACW from 1917 to 1925. She worked to register Black voters, which was resisted by White society and had been made almost impossible by various obstacles in Florida law and practices controlled by White administrators. She was threatened by members of the resurgent Ku Klux Klan in those years. Bethune also served as the president of the Southeastern Federation of Colored Women's Clubs from 1920 to 1925, which worked to improve opportunities for Black women.

She served as the 8th national president of the National Association of Colored Women's Clubs from 1924 to 1928, succeeding Hallie Quinn Brown. While the organization struggled to raise funds for regular operations, Bethune envisioned acquiring a headquarters and hiring a professional executive secretary; she implemented this when NACW bought a property at 1318 Vermont Avenue in Washington, D.C.

Gaining a national reputation, in 1928, Bethune was invited to attend the Child Welfare Conference called by Republican President Calvin Coolidge. In 1930, President Herbert Hoover appointed her to the White House Conference on Child Health.

=== Southeastern Association of Colored Women's Clubs ===
The Southeastern Federation of Colored Women's Clubs (eventually renamed as the Southeastern Association of Colored Women's Clubs) elected Bethune as president after its first conference in 1920 at the Tuskegee Institute. They intended to reach out to Southern women (specifically White women) for support and unity in gaining rights for Black women. The women met in Memphis, Tennessee, to discuss interracial problems.

In many respects, all of the women agreed about what needed to be changed until they came to the topic of suffrage. The White women at the conference tried to strike down a resolution on Black suffrage. The SACWC responded by issuing a pamphlet entitled Southern Negro Women and Race Co-Operation; it delineated their demands regarding conditions in domestic service, child welfare, conditions of travel, education, lynching, the public press, and voting rights.

The group went on to help register Black women to vote after they were granted suffrage resulting from the passage of the constitutional amendment. However, in both Florida and other Southern states, Black men and women experienced disenfranchisement by discriminatory application of literacy and comprehension tests and requirements to pay poll taxes, lengthy residency requirements, and governmental assistance upon keeping and displaying relevant records.

=== National Council of Negro Women ===
In 1935 Bethune founded the National Council of Negro Women (NCNW) in New York City, bringing together representatives of 28 different organizations to work to improve the lives of Black women and their communities. Bethune said of the council:

It is our pledge to make a lasting contribution to all that is finest and best in America, to cherish and enrich her heritage of freedom and progress by working for the integration of all her people regardless of race, creed, or national origin, into her spiritual, social, cultural, civic, and economic life, and thus aid her to achieve the glorious destiny of a true and unfettered democracy.

In 1938, the NCNW hosted the White House Conference on Negro Women and Children, demonstrating the importance of Black women in democratic roles. During World War II, the NCNW gained approval for Black women to be commissioned as officers in the Women's Army Corps. Bethune also served as a political appointee and the Special Assistant to the Secretary of War during the war.

In the 1990s, the headquarters for the National Council for Negro Women moved to Pennsylvania Avenue, centrally located between the White House and the U.S. Capitol. The former headquarters, where Bethune also lived at one time, has been designated as a National Historic Site.

=== National Youth Administration ===
The National Youth Administration (NYA) was a federal agency created under Roosevelt's Works Progress Administration (WPA). It provided programs specifically to promote relief and employment for young people. It focused on unemployed citizens aged sixteen to twenty-five years who were not in school. Bethune lobbied the organization so aggressively and effectively for minority involvement that she earned a full-time staff position in 1936 as an assistant.

Within two years, Bethune was appointed to Director of the Division of Negro Affairs, and became the first Black American female division head. She managed NYA funds to help Black students through school-based programs. She was the only Black agent of the NYA who was a financial manager. She ensured Black colleges participated in the Civilian Pilot Training Program, which graduated some of the first Black pilots. The director of the NYA said in 1939: "No one can do what Mrs. Bethune can do."

Bethune's determination helped national officials recognize the need to improve employment for Black youth. The NYA's final report, issued in 1943, stated,

more than 300,000 black young men and women were given employment and work training on NYA projects. These projects opened to these youth, training opportunities and enabled the majority of them to qualify for jobs heretofore closed to them.

Within the administration, Bethune advocated for the appointment of Black NYA officials to positions of political power. Bethune's administrative assistants served as liaisons between the National Division of Negro Affairs and the NYA agencies on the state and local levels. The high number of administrative assistants composed a workforce commanded by Bethune. They helped gain a better job and salary opportunities for Black people across the country.

During her tenure, Bethune also pushed federal officials to approve a program of consumer education for Blacks and a foundation for Black disabled children. She planned for studies for Black workers' education councils. National officials did not support these due to inadequate funding and fear of duplicating the work of private, non-governmental agencies. The NYA was terminated in 1943.

=== Black Cabinet ===
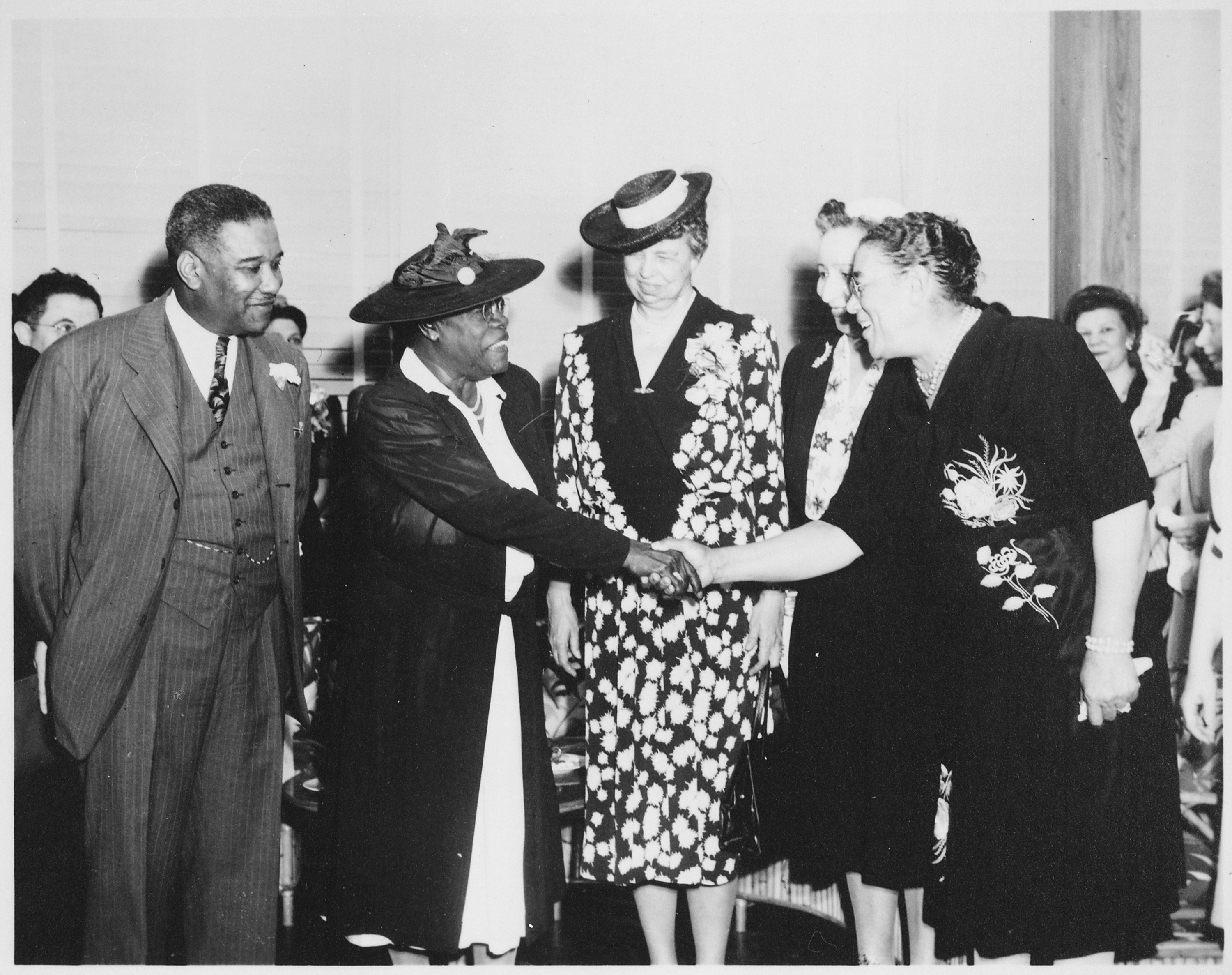
Mary McLeod Bethune (left) and Eleanor Roosevelt (center), year 1943

Bethune became a close and loyal friend of Eleanor and Franklin Roosevelt. At the Southern Conference on Human Welfare in 1938, held in Birmingham, Alabama, Eleanor Roosevelt requested a seat next to Bethune despite state segregation laws. Roosevelt also referred to Bethune as "her closest friend in her age group" frequently. Bethune told Black voters about the work the Roosevelt Administration did on their behalf and made their concerns known to the Roosevelts. She had unprecedented access to the White House through her relationship with the First Lady.

She used this access to form a coalition of leaders from Black organizations called the Federal Council of Negro Affairs, later known as the Black Cabinet. It served as an advisory board to the Roosevelt administration on issues facing Black people in America. It was composed of numerous talented Blacks, mostly men, who had been appointed to positions in federal agencies. This was the first collective of Black people working in higher positions in government.

It suggested to voters that the Roosevelt administration cared about Black concerns. The group met in Bethune's office or apartment informally and rarely kept meeting minutes. Although they did not create public policy directly as advisors, they gained the respect of Black voters as leaders. They also influenced political appointments and the disbursement of funds to organizations that would benefit Black people.

=== Civil rights ===
Bethune coordinated with Methodist church members during the Bethune-Cookman school merger, and she became a member of the church, but it was segregated in the South. Essentially two organizations operated in the Methodist denomination. Bethune was prominent in the primarily Black Florida Conference. While she worked to integrate the mostly White Methodist Episcopal Church, she protested its initial plans for integration because they proposed separate jurisdictions based on race.

Bethune worked to educate both Whites and Blacks about the accomplishments and needs of Black people, writing in 1938,

If our people are to fight their way up out of bondage we must arm them with the sword and the shield and buckler of pride—belief in themselves and their possibilities, based upon a sure knowledge of the achievements of the past.

A year later, she wrote:

Not only the Negro child but children of all races should read and know of the achievements, accomplishments, and deeds of the Negro. World peace and brotherhood are based on a common understanding of the contributions and cultures of all races and creeds.

Starting in 1920, she opened her school to visitors and tourists in Daytona Beach on Sundays, showing off her students' accomplishments, hosting national speakers on Black issues, and taking donations. She ensured that these "Sunday Community Meetings" were integrated. A Black teenager in Daytona at the time later recalled: "Many tourists attended, sitting wherever there were empty seats. There was no special section for white people." Florida law proscribed interracial meetings, a rule which Bethune ignored.

When the U.S. Supreme Court ruled in Brown v. Board of Education (1954) that segregation of public schools was unconstitutional, Bethune defended the decision by writing in the Chicago Defender that year:

There can be no divided democracy, no class government, no half-free county, under the constitution. Therefore, there can be no discrimination, no segregation, no separation of some citizens from the rights which belong to all. ... We are on our way. But these are frontiers that we must conquer. ... We must gain full equality in education ... in the franchise ... in economic opportunity, and full equality in the abundance of life.

Bethune organized the first officer candidate schools for Black women. She lobbied federal officials, including Roosevelt, on behalf of Black American women who wanted to join the military.

=== United Negro College Fund ===
She co-founded the United Negro College Fund (UNCF) on April 25, 1944, with William J. Trent and Frederick D. Patterson. The UNCF is a program which gives many different scholarships, mentorships, and job opportunities to Black American and other minority students attending any of the 37 historically Black colleges and universities. Bethune helped with its initial fundraising efforts, which gathered around $900,000 (equivalent to $16,500,000 in 2025) in six months. Bethune continued to refer philanthropists to the fund, and she joined the board of directors in 1952.

== Death and accolades ==
On May 18, 1955, Mary McLeod Bethune died of a heart attack. Her death was followed by editorial tributes in Black American newspapers across the United States. The Oklahoma City Black Dispatch stated she was "Exhibit No. 1 for all who have faith in America and the democratic process". The Atlanta Daily World said her life was "One of the most dramatic careers ever enacted at any time upon the stage of human activity." Moreover, the Pittsburgh Courier wrote: "In any race or nation she would have been an outstanding personality and made a noteworthy contribution because her chief attribute was her indomitable soul."

The mainstream press praised her as well. Christian Century suggested, "the story of her life should be taught to every school child for generations to come." The New York Times noted she was "one of the most potent factors in the growth of interracial goodwill in America." The Washington Post said: "So great were her dynamism and force that it was almost impossible to resist her ... Not only her own people, but all America has been enriched and ennobled by her courageous, ebullient spirit." Her hometown newspaper, the Daytona Beach Evening News printed, "To some, she seemed unreal, something that could not be. ... What right had she to greatness? ... The lesson of Mrs. Bethune's life is that genius knows no racial barriers." McLeod Bethune is buried on the campus of Bethune-Cookman University in Daytona Beach, Florida.

== Personal life ==
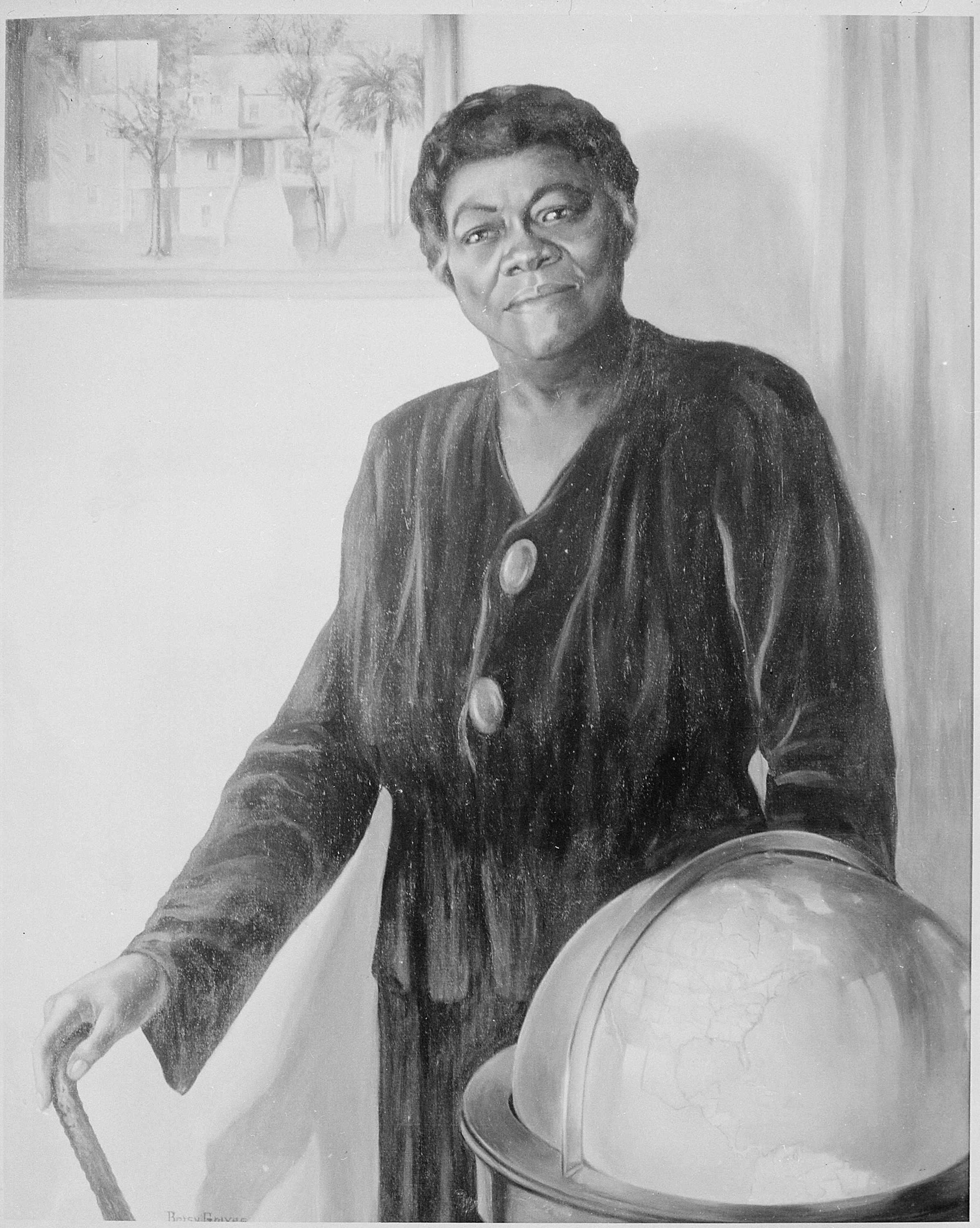
Painting of Bethune by Betsy Graves Reyneau

Bethune carried a cane for effect, rather than mobility support, stating that it gave her "swank". She was a teetotaler and preached temperance for Black Americans, chastising Blacks who were intoxicated publicly. Bethune claimed that the students and teachers in Daytona were her first family. Her students often referred to her as "Mother Bethune".

She was noted for achieving her goals. Robert Weaver, who also served in Roosevelt's Black Cabinet, said of her, "She had the most marvelous gift of effecting feminine helplessness in order to attain her aims with masculine ruthlessness." When a White Daytona resident threatened Bethune's students with a rifle, Bethune worked to make an ally of him. The director of the McLeod Hospital recalled, "Mrs. Bethune treated him with courtesy and developed such goodwill in him that we found him protecting the children and going so far as to say, 'If anybody bothers old Mary, I will protect her with my life.'"

She prioritized self-sufficiency throughout her life. Bethune invested in several businesses, including the Pittsburgh Courier, a Black newspaper, and many life insurance companies. She also founded Central Life Insurance Company of Florida, and later retired in Florida. Due to state segregation, Blacks were not allowed to visit the beach. Bethune and several other business owners responded by investing in and purchasing Paradise Beach, a 2-mile (3.2 km) stretch of beach and the surrounding properties and then selling them to Black families. They also allowed White families to visit the waterfront. Eventually, Paradise Beach was named Bethune-Volusia Beach in her honor. She held 25% ownership of the Welricha Motel in Daytona.

== Legacy and honors ==
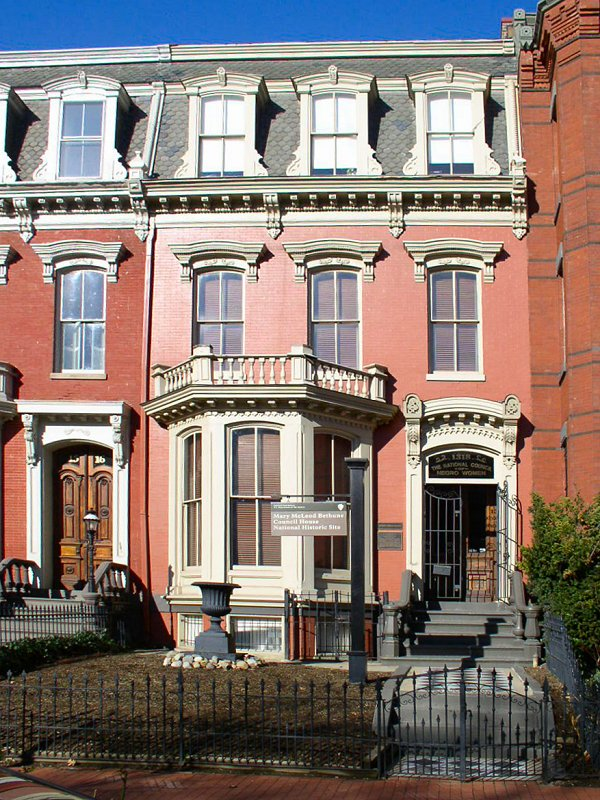
The Mary McLeod Bethune Council House National Historic Site in Washington, D.C.

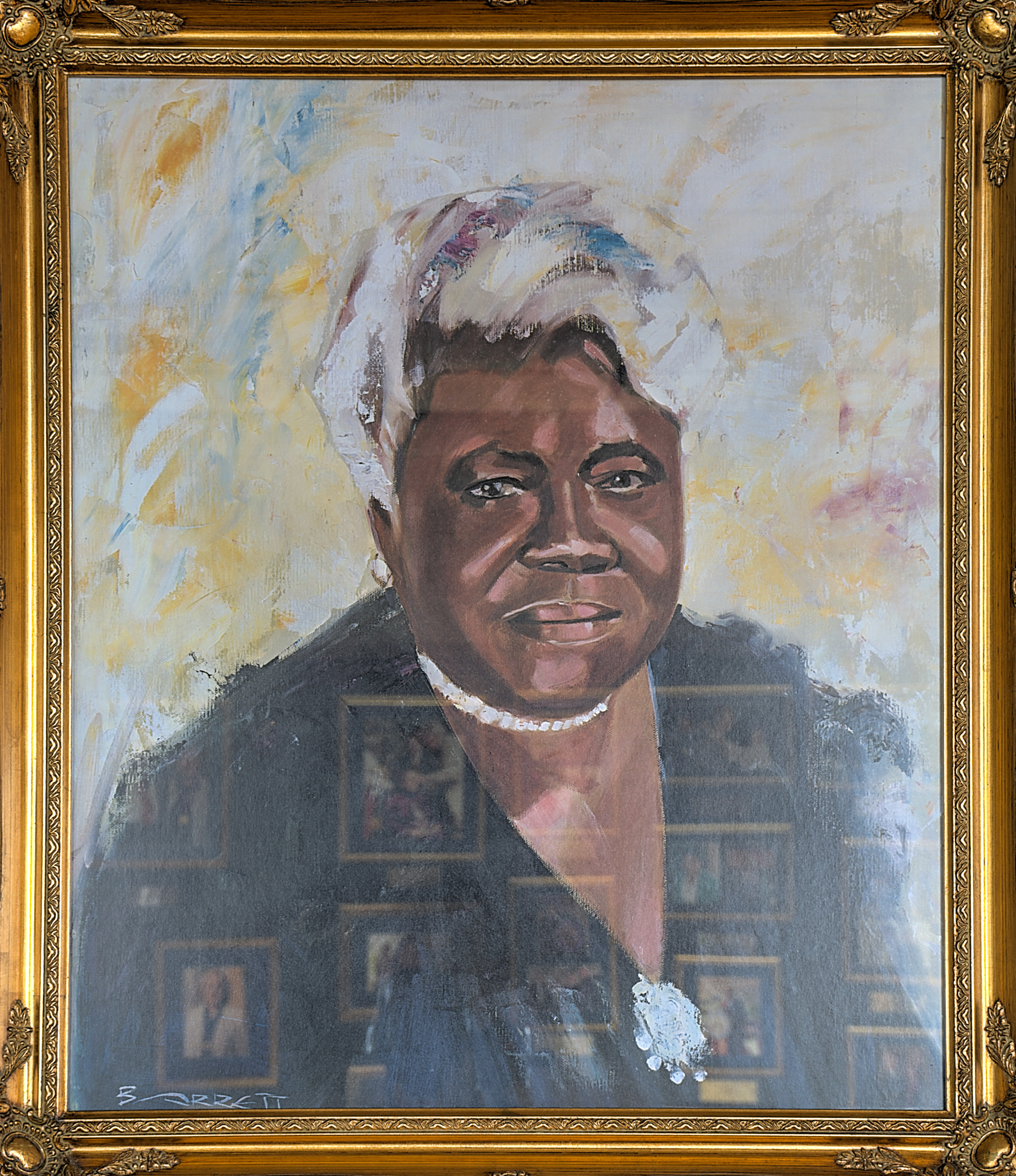
A painting of Bethune on display at the World Methodist Museum, Lake Junaluska, North Carolina

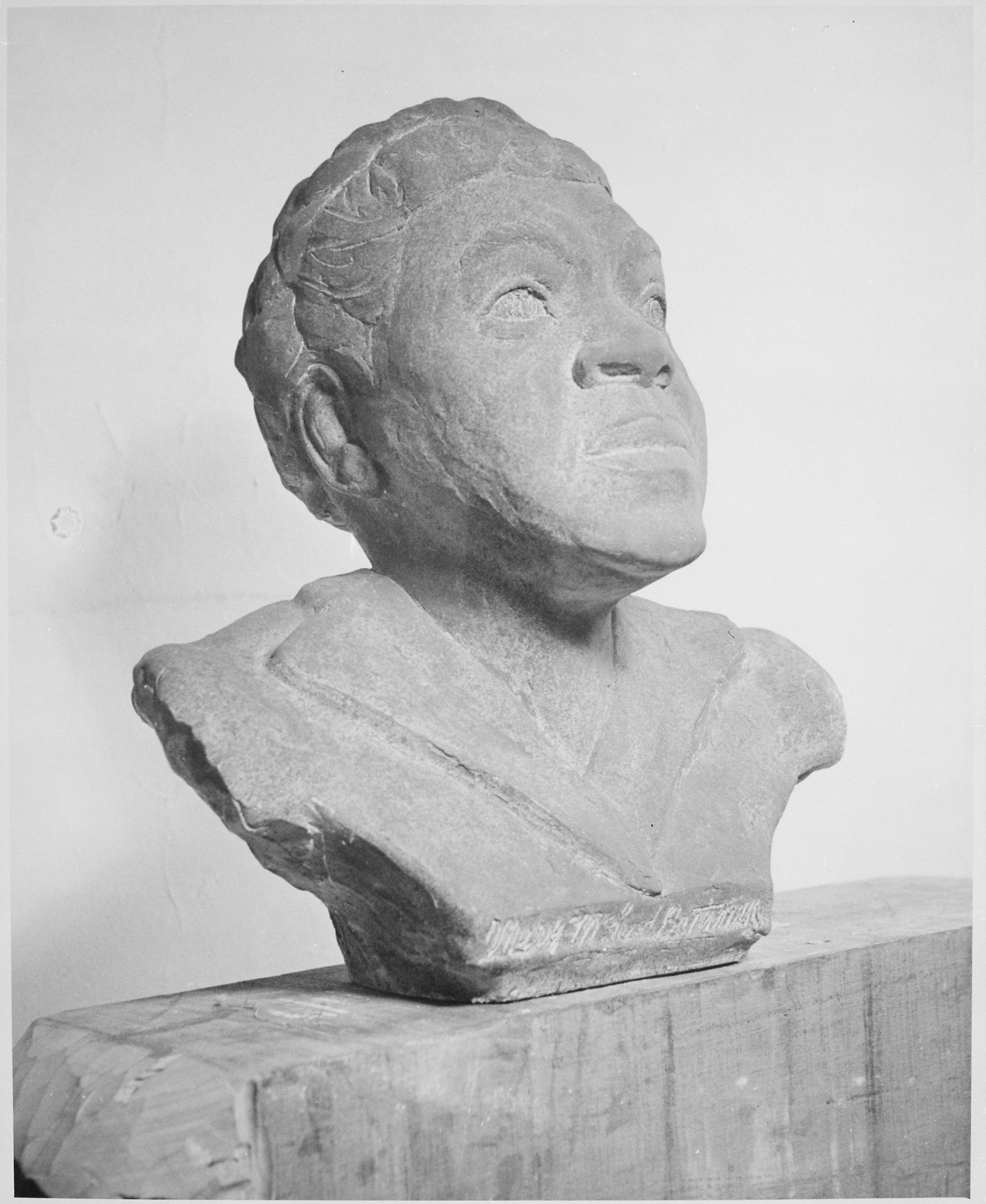
Mary Bethune bust by Selma Burke

In 1930, journalist Ida Tarbell included Bethune as number 10 on her list of America's greatest women. Bethune was awarded the Spingarn Medal in 1935 by the NAACP.

Bethune was the only Black woman present at the founding of the United Nations in San Francisco in 1945, representing the NAACP with W. E. B. Du Bois and Walter White. In 1949, she became the first woman to receive the National Order of Honour and Merit, Haiti's highest award. She served as a U.S. emissary to the re-inauguration of President William V. S. Tubman of Liberia in 1949.

She also served as an adviser to five of the presidents of the United States. Calvin Coolidge and Franklin D. Roosevelt appointed her to several government positions, which included: Special Advisor in Minority Affairs, director of the Division of Negro Affairs of the National Youth Administration, and chair of Federal Council of Negro Affairs. Among her honors, she was an assistant director of the Women's Army Corps. She was also an honorary member of Delta Sigma Theta sorority and Iota Phi Lambda Sorority, Inc.

In 1973, Bethune was inducted into the National Women's Hall of Fame. On July 10, 1974, the anniversary of her 99th birthday, the Mary McLeod Bethune Memorial, by artist Robert Berks, was erected in her honor in Lincoln Park (Washington, D.C.). It was the first monument honoring an Black American or a woman to be installed in a public park in the District of Columbia. The inscription on the pedestal reads "let her works praise her" (a reference to Proverbs 31:31), while the side is engraved with passage headings from her "Last Will and Testament":

I leave you to love. I leave you to hope. I leave you the challenge of developing confidence in one another. I leave you a thirst for education. I leave you a respect for the uses of power. I leave you faith. I leave you racial dignity. I leave you a desire to live harmoniously with your fellow men. I leave you, finally, a responsibility to our young people.

In 1976, a portrait of Bethune, painted by artist Simmie Knox, was unveiled in the South Carolina House of Representatives. as part of a day of events observing the United States Bicentennial. Speakers during the day of events included Dorothy Height, President of the National Council of Negro Women; Governor James B. Edwards, Senate president pro tempore Marion Gressette; House Speaker Rex Carter, Commissioner of the South Carolina Human Affairs Commission Jim Clyburn and National Council of Negro Women event Co-Chair Alma W. Byrd.

In 1985, the U.S. Postal Service issued a stamp in Bethune's honor. In 1989, Ebony magazine listed her as one of "50 Most Important Figures in Black American History". In 1999, Ebony included her as one of the "100 Most Fascinating Black Women of the 20th century". In 1991, the International Astronomical Union named a crater on planet Venus in her honor.

In 1994, the National Park Service acquired Bethune's last residence, the NACW Council House at 1318 Vermont Avenue. The former headquarters was designated as the Mary McLeod Bethune Council House National Historic Site.

Schools have been named in her honor in Los Angeles, Chicago, San Diego, Dallas, Phoenix, Palm Beach, Florida, Miami, Florida Moreno Valley, California, Minneapolis, Ft. Lauderdale, Atlanta, Philadelphia, Folkston and College Park, Georgia, New Orleans, Rochester, New York, Cleveland, South Boston, Virginia, Jacksonville, Florida, and Milwaukee, Wisconsin.

In 2002, scholar Molefi Kete Asante listed Bethune on his list of 100 Greatest African Americans.

The Legislature of Florida in 2018 designated her as the subject of one of Florida's two statues in the National Statuary Hall Collection, replacing Confederate General Edmund Kirby Smith. The statue of Mary McLeod Bethune was unveiled on July 13, 2022, in the United States Capitol, making her the first Black American represented in the National Statuary Hall Collection. A bronze copy of the marble statue was completed by the same artist, Nilda Comas, and erected in Daytona Beach's riverfront park beside the News-Journal Center August 18, 2022.

In 2019, Time created 89 new covers to celebrate women of the year starting from 1920; it chose Bethune for 1934.

The Mary McLeod Bethune Scholarship Program, for Floridian students wishing to attend historically Black colleges and universities within the state, is named in her honor.

A statue of Bethune in Jersey City, New Jersey, was dedicated in 2021 in a namesake park across the street from the Mary McLeod Bethune Life Center.

Moody Bible Institute in Chicago, where she had enrolled in 1894, dedicated the "Bethune-Fitzwater Educational Building" on Oct 1, 2024.

Bethune appears as a character in the 2024 war film The Six Triple Eight, where she is depicted attempting to persuade Roosevelt of the importance of delivering mail to soldiers fighting in Europe. She is played by Oprah Winfrey.

== See also ==
- African-American history
- African-American literature
- List of African-American writers
- List of people on stamps of the United States

== Works cited ==
- Hanson, Joyce A. (2018). Mary McLeod Bethune and Black Women's Political Activism. University of Missouri. ISBN 9780826221544.
- McCluskey and Smith, Audrey Thomas and Elaine M. (2001). Mary McLeod Bethune: Building a Better World Essays and Selected Documents. Indiana University Press. pp. 5–6.
- Robertson, Ashley N. (2015). Mary Mcleod Bethune in Florida: Bringing Social Justice to the Sunshine State. Charleston, SC: History Press. ISBN 9781626199835.
