= Mary McLeod Bethune Memorial =

Memorial by Robert Berks in Washington, D.C., U.S.

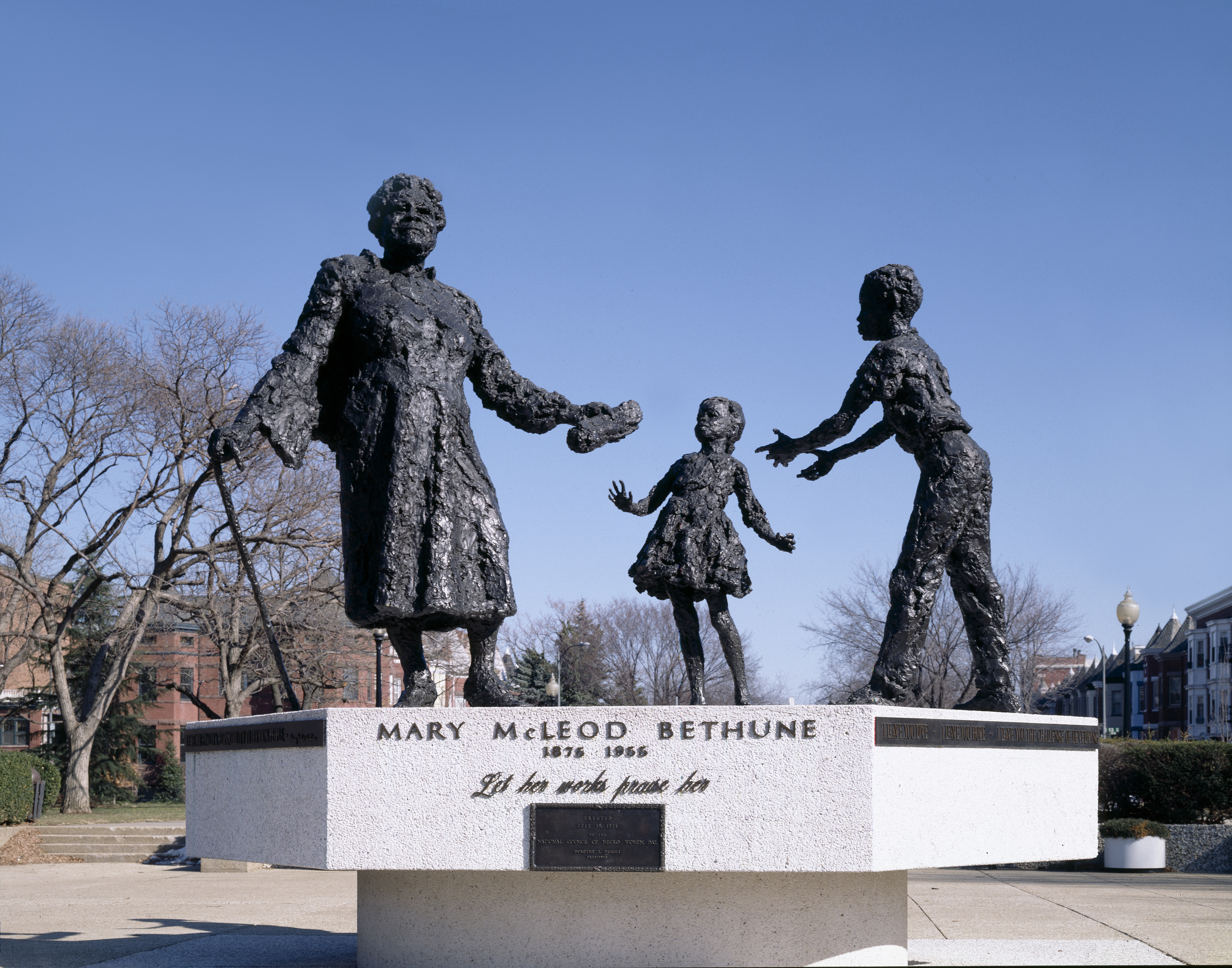
- Artist: Robert Berks
- Type: Bronze
- Location: Washington, D.C.; 38.889722°N 76.988889°W
- Owner: National Park Service

Mary McLeod Bethune Memorial is a bronze-cast statue by the American sculptor Robert Berks honoring American educator and activist Mary McLeod Bethune.

The monument is the first statue erected on public land in Washington, D.C. to honor both an African American and a woman. The statue features an elderly Mrs. Bethune handing scroll containing her legacy to two young black children. Mrs. Bethune is supporting herself by a cane which belonged to President Franklin D. Roosevelt. It was given to Mrs. Bethune by Eleanor Roosevelt, with whom she had a close friendship, upon President Roosevelt's death in 1945. The statue was unveiled on the anniversary of her 99th birthday, July 10, 1974, before a crowd of over 18,000 people. The funds for the monument were raised by the National Council of Negro Women, the organization Mrs. Bethune founded in 1935.

It is located in Lincoln Park, at East Capitol Street and 12th Street N.E. Washington, D.C.

The inscription reads:
(Front bottom of Bethune's dress:)
(copyright symbol)
73
Berks (Front of base:)
MARY McLEOD BETHUNE
1875 1955
(Front of base, in script:)
Let her works praise her
(Bronze plaque, front of base:)
ERECTED
JULY 10, 1974
BY THE
NATIONAL COUNCIL OF NEGRO WOMEN, INC.
DOROTHY I. HEIGHT
PRESIDENT
(Bronze plaque running around sides of base:)
I LEAVE YOU LOVE. I LEAVE YOU HOPE. I LEAVE YOU THE CHALLENGE OF DEVELOPING CONFIDENCE IN ONE ANOTHER. I LEAVE YOU A THIRST FOR EDUCATION. I LEAVE YOU A RESPECT FOR THE USE OF POWER. I LEAVE YOU FAITH. I LEAVE YOU RACIAL DIGNITY. I LEAVE YOU A DESIRE TO LIVE HARMONIOUSLY WITH YOUR FELLOW MEN. I LEAVE YOU FINALLY, A RESPONSIBILITY TO OUR YOUNG PEOPLE.
Mary McLeod Bethune (in script)

== See also ==
- List of public art in Washington, D.C., Ward 6
- Statue of Mary McLeod Bethune (Jersey City)
- Statue of Mary McLeod Bethune (U.S. Capitol)
