= Statue of Mary McLeod Bethune (Jersey City) =

Outdoor sculpture in New Jersey

Coordinates: 40.705139°N 74.086778°W

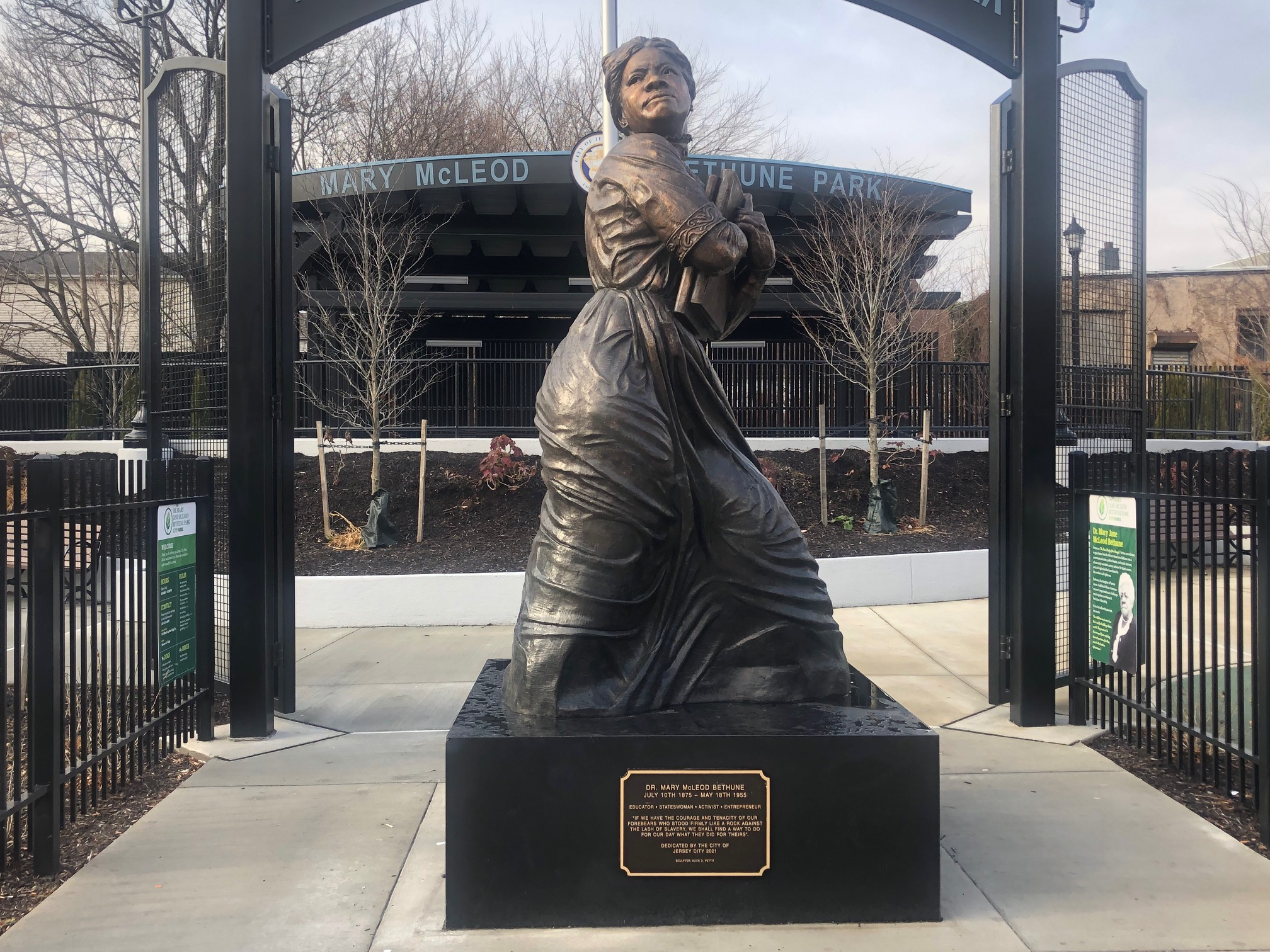
- Artist: Alvin Petit
- Year: 2021
- Type: Bronze
- Dimensions: 9 ft (2.7 m) (height)
- Location: Greenville Jersey City, New Jersey

The statue of Mary McLeod Bethune in Jersey City, New Jersey is located in the Greenville section. It honors the educator and civil rights leader Mary McLeod Bethune (1875 – 1955).

It was dedicated on November 22, 2021 and marked the completion of the namesake Bethune Park, which opened in August 2021, and is opposite the Bethune Center on Martin Luther King Drive. The bronze 9 feet (2.7 m) tall statue on a 2.5 feet (0.76 m) marble pedestal is inspired by Bethune in her late 20s to early 30s.

The statue was designed by Alvin Petit who said of the work: “As a broader significance, this also plays a role in linking our City with a national movement to erect monuments that symbolize diversity and inclusiveness. This will be the first statue in Jersey City to honor the legacy of an African American woman.”

The inscription reads:

DR. MARY McCLEOD BETHUNE
July 10, 1875 – May 18, 1955
EDUCATOR * STATESWOMEN * ACTIVIST * ENTREPRENEUR
"If we have the courage and tenacity of our
forebears who stood firmly like a rock against
the lash of slavery, we shall find a way to do
for our day what they did for theirs."

== See also ==
- List of public art in Jersey City, New Jersey
- Statue of Mary McLeod Bethune (disambiguation)
- Mary McLeod Bethune Memorial
