= Edgar Allan Brown =

American politician (1888–1975)

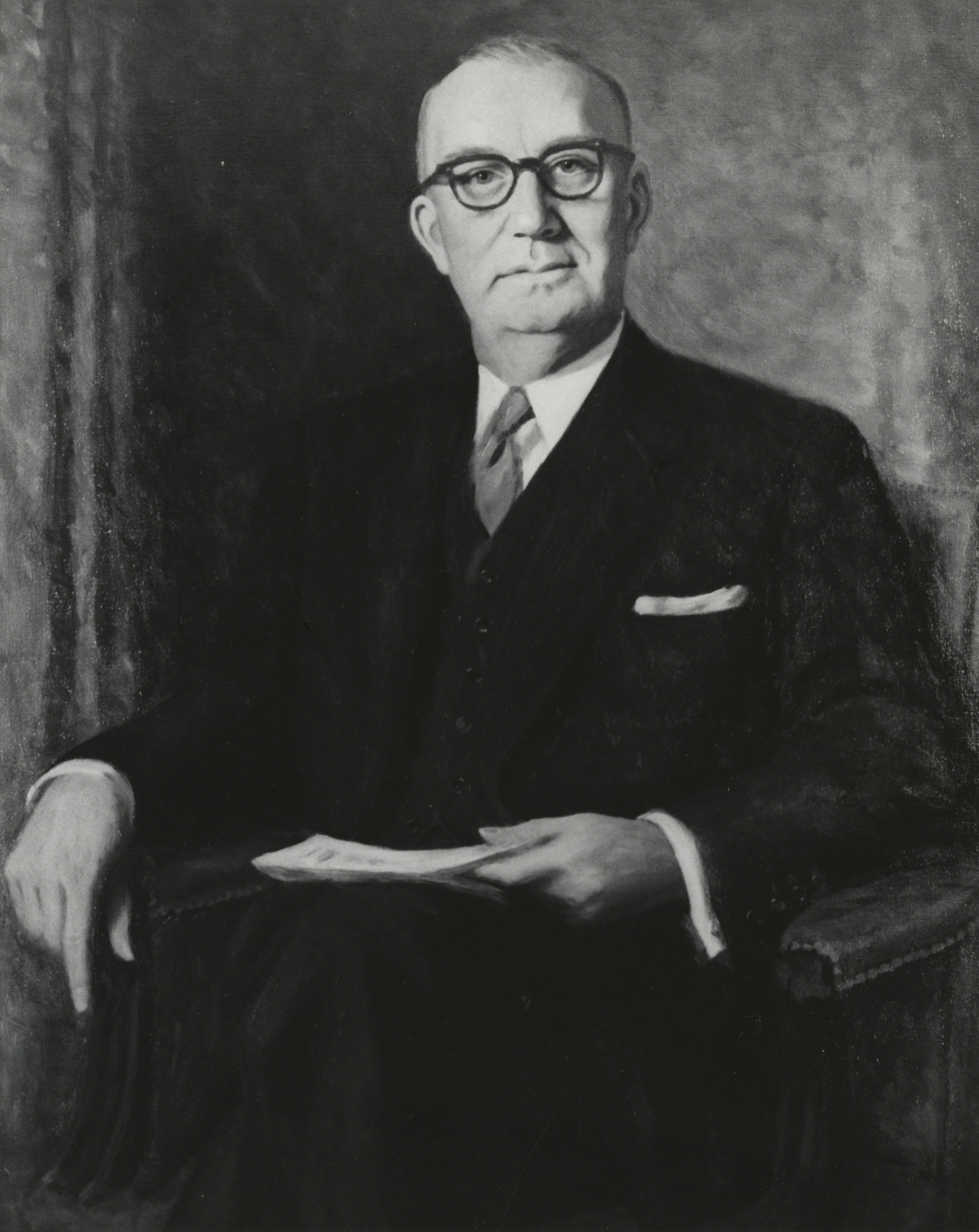

Member of the South Carolina Senate
- In office 1929–1972

Member of the South Carolina House of Representatives
- In office 1922–1927

Personal details
- Born: July 11, 1888 Aiken County, South Carolina, U.S.
- Died: June 26, 1975 (aged 86) Barnwell, South Carolina, U.S.

Edgar Allan Brown (July 11, 1888 – June 26, 1975) was a long time Democratic legislator of South Carolina from Barnwell County who served South Carolina from 1922 to 1972. He was a principal member of the so-called "Barnwell Ring".

== Early life and career ==
Brown was born near Shiloh Springs in Aiken County to Augustus Abraham Brown and Elizabeth Howard Brown. He, accompanied by his oldest sibling, Minnie, attended the China Springs School close to Edgefield Road. He was also educated at The Graniteville Academy which was maintained by the Graniteville Company. Edgar decided to drop out of the academy in 1904 and to instead apply himself to the business course of study at Osborne's in Augusta, Georgia. From 1905 to 1906 he served as a court reporter and from 1906 to 1907 he was a law clerk and head stenographer for the Henderson firm in Aiken while also studying law. In 1908, Brown was appointed the official court stenographer of the 2nd Judicial Circuit after competitive examination and relocated to Barnwell to serve Judge Aldrich who had need of his services. Brown passed the state bar examination in June 1910 and was admitted to practice law the same year.

Having established himself as an attorney, Brown continued to court and spark Miss Annie Love Sitgreaves, a teacher originally from Laurens, whom he had met in Aiken, and he and James F. Byrnes, whom Brown had replaced as court stenographer when Byrnes ran for solicitor, became so close that Brown asked Byrnes to be the best man at his wedding.

== Political career ==
At the age of 26 in 1914, Brown became the chairman of the Democratic executive committee of Barnwell County and also served as a member of the state Democratic executive committee. In 1921, Brown was elected to the South Carolina House of Representatives and he became the speaker of the body in 1925. From 1922 to 1926, Brown was the chairman of the state Democratic Party. Brown resigned his speakership in 1926 to challenge Senator Ellison D. Smith in the Democratic primary election, but fell short by 5,000 votes in the runoff election.

In 1928, Brown returned to the statehouse, this time as the senator for Barnwell County. Brown once again challenged Senator Smith, along with Olin D. Johnston, in the 1938 Democratic primary, but Smith pulled out another victory. In 1942, Brown was elected by the state senate to the position of President Pro Tempore, a position he held along with the chairmanship of the finance committee for thirty years. Upon the death of Senator Burnet R. Maybank in 1954, the executive committee of the state Democratic Party chose him as their nominee for the general election. The absence of a primary election caused an uproar in the state and Strom Thurmond defeated Brown as a write-in candidate. Brown retired from the state Senate on July 28, 1972.

During Brown's legislative service, he was known for conservative fiscal policies, financing the state road system with gasoline tax revenue bonds, and improving education in the state as well as implementing the South Carolina Educational Television. SCETV station WEBA-TV (channel 14), which is licensed to Allendale and covers Barnwell County, was named in honor of Brown upon its sign-on in 1967.

== Personal life ==
His parents, Augustus Brown and Elizabeth Howard were married on March 29, 1875, and settled on a part of the Brown family farm, which Needham [Gus's father] had given to them. Brown had four siblings; Minnie, John (who died at sixteen), Lula, and Grover. Brown married Annie Love Sitgreaves, daughter of Edwin McBurney and Centellia Martin Sitgreaves, on December 30, 1913, and together they had one child, Emily McBurney Brown. Brown was also survived by a grandson, Richard Allan Jefferies, and a granddaughter, Emily McBurney Jefferies. His son-in-law Richard Manning Jefferies, Jr. (son of Governor Richard Manning Jefferies) served as chairman of SCETV.

Brown died after suffering injuries in an automobile accident.

Brown served as a trustee of Clemson University. The University Union was renamed in his honor after his 1975 death.

Party political offices
Preceded by Burnet R. Maybank	Democratic nominee for U.S. Senator from South Carolina (Class 2); 1954	Succeeded by Strom Thurmond
