= Marion Gressette =

American politician

L. Marion Gressette
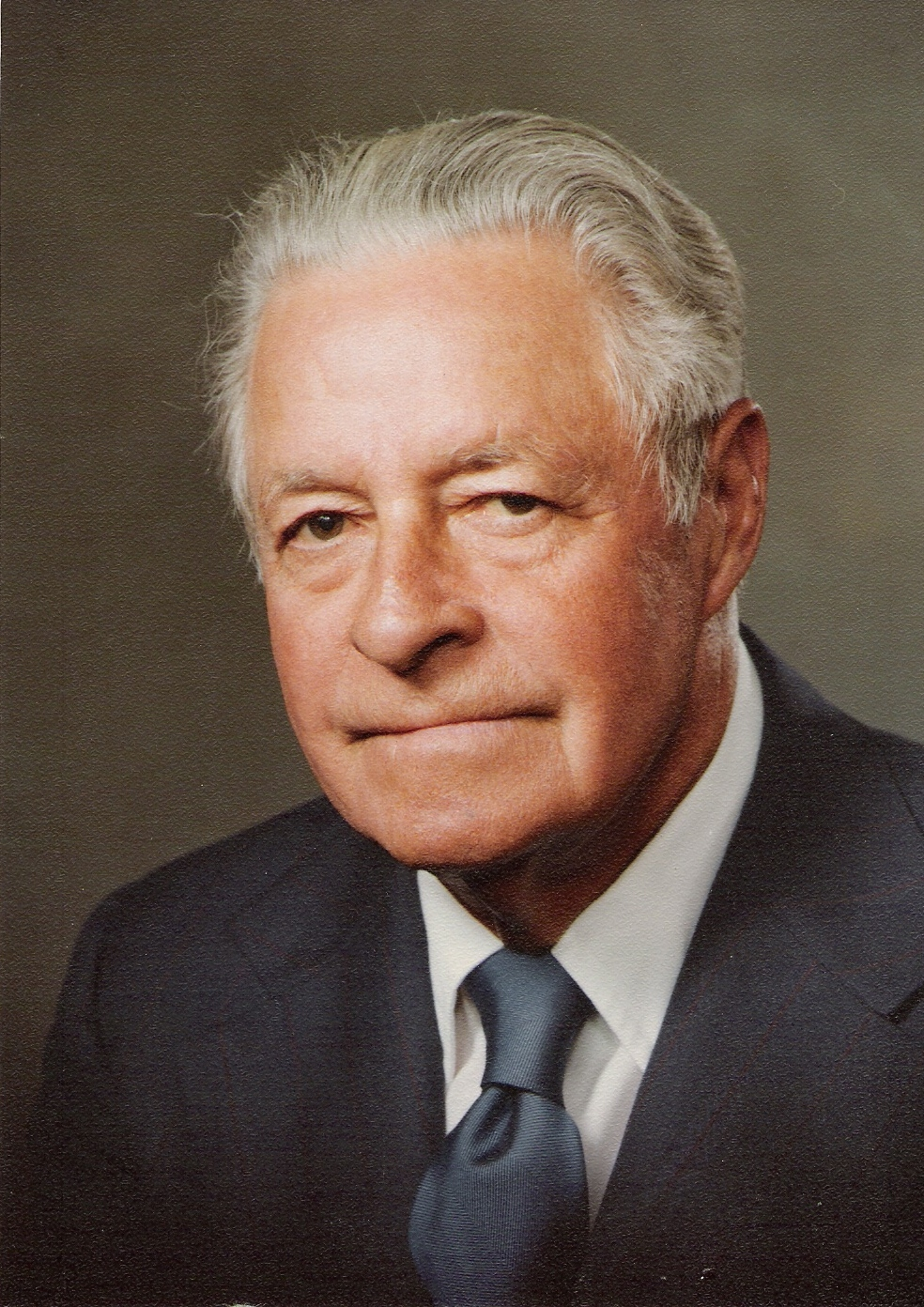

Member of the South Carolina Senate
- In office 1937–1984

Personal details
- Born: February 11, 1902 Orangeburg County, South Carolina, US
- Died: March 1, 1984 (aged 82) Orangeburg, South Carolina, US
- Resting place: West End Cemetery, St. Matthews, South Carolina
- Party: Democratic
- Spouse: Florence Howell Gressette (m. 1927)
- Education: University of South Carolina

Lawrence Marion Gressette (February 11, 1902 – March 1, 1984) was an American politician in the state of South Carolina. Gressette served in the South Carolina General Assembly from 1925 to 1928 and 1931 to 1932. He served in the South Carolina Senate as a member of the Democratic Party from 1937 to 1984. He also served a stint as president pro tempore of the South Carolina Senate from 1972 to 1984.

== Early life ==
Lawrence Marion Gressette was born in the Center Hill Section of Orangeburg County. He attended the University of South Carolina for both his undergraduate and law degrees. While there, he was a member of the Euphradian Society. Gressette ran for the South Carolina General Assembly in 1925 and served until 1928. He lost reelection, but returned to the General Assembly from 1931 to 1932.

== Senate career ==
Gressette won election to the South Carolina Senate in 1937 – a position he would serve until his death in 1984, earning the nickname "the Silver Fox" of the Senate. While he chaired a number of committees including the Rules Committee (1959-1974), the Highways Committee (1973-1975), the Natural Resources Committee (1945-1950), he is best known for his service on the Senate Judiciary Committee and the South Carolina School Committee, often referred to as the "Gressette Committee".

As Chairman of the South Carolina School Committee, Gressette worked to avoid desegregation of the state's public school system, including efforts that removed the mandate for public schools from the state constitution. The Committee was disbanded in 1966 after concerns over cost and the conclusion of legal questions. Looking back, Gressette said "The Committee's real accomplishment was in preventing violence."

Over time, Gressette's views on integration changed as reapportionment saw him serving a district that was predominantly black including Orangeburg County. He became an advocate for the historically black university in Orangeburg, South Carolina State College, and in 1974, supported legislation that made Martin Luther King's birthday a state holiday.

His Senate career also included legislation to make the state Commission on Human Affairs a permanent part of the state government, and staunch opposition to the Equal Rights Amendment.

== Death and legacy ==
Gressette died on March 1, 1984, of congestive heart failure. In 1979, a building for offices of members of the South Carolina Legislature was dedicated the "Gressette Building."

He had received honorary doctorates from the University of South Carolina (1977), Clemson University (1980) and The Citadel (1981).
