= Generalist =

A generalist is a person with a wide array of knowledge on a variety of subjects, useful or not. It may also refer to:

== Occupations ==
- a physician who provides general health care, as opposed to a medical specialist; see also:
  - General practitioner, a medical doctor who treats acute and chronic illnesses and provides preventive care and health education to patients
  - Family medicine, comprehensive health care for people of all ages
- Information Technology Generalist, a technology professional proficient in many facets of information technology without any specific specialty

== Biology ==
- Generalist species, a species which can survive in multiple habitats or eat food from multiple sources
- Generalist Genes Hypothesis, a theory of learning abilities and disabilities

== Other ==
- "Jack of all trades, master of none", a figure of speech about generalists
- a multipotentialite, someone having exceptional interest, and talent, in two or more fields.
- Philomath, someone who loves learning
- Polymath, someone whose knowledge spans a substantial number of subjects
- Generalist channel, a TV or radio channel without a particular target audience

== See also ==
- Encyclopedism, an outlook that aims to include a wide range of knowledge in a single work
- Interdisciplinarity, the combining of two or more academic disciplines in one activity
- Laity, religious group members who are not clerics, sometimes also used metaphorically to describe non-specialists
- Jack of all trades (disambiguation)
- Specialist (disambiguation)
