= Euphemian Literary Society =

Literary society at Erskine College, South Carolina, US

- ΕΛΣ
- Founded: 1839; 187 years ago Erskine College
- Type: Literary
- Affiliation: Independent
- Status: Active
- Emphasis: debate
- Scope: Local
- Motto: Ζη τη πατριδι χαι τω θεω "Live for your Country and your God"
- Colors: Green and Gold
- Chapters: 1
- Nickname: Euphies
- Headquarters: Due West, South Carolina; United States
- Website: The Euphemian Literary Society

The Euphemian Literary Society, founded in 1839, is the oldest student organization in South Carolina still operating under its original charter. Euphemian Hall is located in Due West, South Carolina, on the Erskine College campus. It (Euphemian Literary Society) is a literary society at Erskine College. The society is chartered by the State of South Carolina.

Euphemian Hall is a contributing property in the Erskine College-Due West Historic District, which was added to the National Register of Historic Places on March 19, 1982. The building was constructed in a Neoclassical design.

== History ==
In 1839, the Clark and Erskine Seminary became a four-year institution with a preparatory department. Before 1839, John S. Pressly was the sole instructor of the seminary. In October of that year, Pressly resigned from his position as principal of the Literary Department. Ebenezer Erskine Pressly, pastor of the Due West Associate Reformed Presbyterian Church, was chosen to succeed J. S. Pressly as head of the school. E. E. Pressly had been elected professor of divinity at the Erskine Theological Seminary in 1837.

E. E. Pressly was a native of Cedar Springs, South Carolina. He entered Miami University at Oxford, Ohio, in 1824, at the age of sixteen, and graduated two years later. While at Miami, Pressly was a member of the Erodelphian Literary Society. This society and the Miami Union Literary Society published the first collegiate publication west of the Appalachians in 1827. Literary societies were quite popular at this time. Most colleges had at least one literary society. As early as 1789, a literary society was at Hampden-Sydney College. The Euphradian and Clariosophic societies were founded at South Carolina College (now the University of South Carolina) in 1806, and in 1837 the Eumenean and Philanthropic societies were founded at Davidson College. Therefore, it was natural for the Erskine faculty and students to desire to have a literary society.

October 1839 has traditionally been recognized as the date that the Euphemian Literary Society was founded. This date has been proven by the research of the Legislative Acts of South Carolina made during that time.

The by-laws of the society contained many rules and regulations by which members were to abide. These rules give great insight into how meetings were conducted in the early years. Some of these laws were:

- The secretary was to report all absences when the roll was called to the tribunal.
  - Members not present would be fined twenty-five cents.
  - If a member left the hall for more than twenty minutes they would be fined fifty cents.
  - Absence from the meeting except in case of an emergency - fine of one dollar.
- Use of profane language during debate called for suspension.
- Entering the hall intoxicated during a session called for expulsion.

The Euphemian Society grew at a rapid pace, and by 1841 it had fifty-eight members. However, some Erskine students refused to join the Euphemians. Also, some members desired to have the rivalries in debate that were known at Miami. Therefore, in 1841 twelve Euphemians broke away and started the Philomathean Literary Society (which is not associated with the Philomathean Society of the University of Pennsylvania). The Philomathean Society was considered a "mission project" by the Euphemians. The societies met in the old main building with the Euphemians meeting on the second floor and the Philomatheans meeting on the third floor. Each society was responsible for decorating its hall and maintaining its library.

In 1849, the Euphemian Literary Society was chartered under Act 87 of the South Carolina General Assembly. The Euphemians are the oldest student organization in South Carolina still operating under its original charter. This was one year before Erskine College received its charter. When Erskine reopened its doors in 1865, there were not enough students to support both societies. Therefore, they were consolidated into one society called the Adelphian Society. Meetings alternated between Euphemian and Philomathean Halls. This arrangement continued until about 1867. This is the first date after the War that the Euphemians list a graduate.

In 1912, J. J. Darlington, a prominent Washington attorney, and former Philomathean, presented Erskine College with a sterling silver, Tiffany crafted trophy to be awarded to the winner of the annual intersociety debate. This trophy became known as the Darlington Cup.

In 1957, a group of women wished to organize a sister organization for the Euphemians. Mr. Sam Agnew, Euphemian president, presided over a meeting of these ladies and Euphemians in November 1957. It was during this meeting that the Athenian Literary Society was formed. The Athenians split from the Euphemians in 1995. There was an Athenian Society at Erskine in the late 1930s - early 1940s, but the present Athenians are in no way associated with the former society.

The rivalry intensified in the late 1960s between the Euphemians and the Philomatheans. In 1967, the Philomatheans stole the "Euphemian rock" which had been in the old hall. The Euphemians retaliated by placing chickens in Philomathean Hall. In the early 1970s, the Philomatheans stole the Darlington Cup from the Euphemians. The Euphemians had won the last debate and no debates had taken place in several years. The Philomatheans contended that the trophy was given to them by their alumnus, J. J. Darlington. The Euphemians claimed that the trophy was given to both societies. James A. Quinn and Richard B. Thompson researched the issue and presented their case before the Student Government Association. The S. G. A. forced the Philomatheans to give the trophy back to the Euphemians.

During the seventies, the society also became less of an academic organization and more of a social organization. In 1985, the Euphemian men created a new sister organization called the "Euphemian Little Sisters". This organization operates as an article of the Euphemian constitution and abides by the Euphemian constitution. It was also during this time that the society changed its jersey colors to black and red. In 1996, the society inducted Drs. William F. Junkin, William Parker Bowie, and Marie Thomason Bowie as honorary members of the society on Alumni Day 1996. Dr. Marie Bowie treated the Euphemian men to lunch at her home on the Sunday preceding her induction.

In 2007, the society grew to more than thirty members, topping society member numbers for more than twenty years. The Euphemian Literary Society along with Velocity Disc Golf designed and constructed a nine-hole disc golf course on the Erskine College campus. In 2013, the Euphemians voted to change the terms of elected officers to fit that of other organizations on Erskine's campus. The cabinet is elected at the end of the fall term and serves until the end of the next fall term.

== Symbols and traditions ==
During the first years of its existence, the society's badge consisted of a six-inch piece of blue ribbon with the society's motto, "Non Dicere, sid apti Dicere", written on it. In 1854, a committee was appointed to design a new emblem for the society. The committee submitted a rhombus with the letters E, L, S, in the left, upper, and right corners respectively with the new Greek motto "Ζη τη πατριδι χαι τω θεω" ("Live for your Country and your God") in the center. This is the emblem presently used by the society.

A question that has intrigued society for years is the origin of the name Euphemian. Several different stories have existed explaining the name. One story claims that the name was derived from the Eumenean Literary Society at Miami University of which E. E. Pressly was a member. This cannot be true. First, E. E. Pressly was a member of the Erodelphian Literary Society. Second, Miami University does not have any records showing that the Eumenean Society ever existed. The most plausible story is one that is found in the 1910 Erskiniana, the yearbook of Erskine College. According to a historical sketch in that annual, the society was named for Mrs. Euphemia Young, wife of Professor John N. Young. The word is also derived from the Greek euphemismos which means "well spoken".

During the seventies, the Euphemians began wearing jerseys. These were green in color with yellow trim and the letters Epsilon Lambda Sigma on the front. In 2016, the society amended its wardrobe phasing out the jerseys and transitioning into polos. The polos are grey with the official Euphemian Literary Society badge on the left breast and the Greek letters embroidered on the right sleeve.

In 2007, the colors were changed to green and gold.

In Fall 2023, a stone pig was purchased with embezzled Euphemian funds and promptly named Ængus Guthrie Bartholemew III. Ængus quickly became an integral part of the Euphie Rush. The physical features of Ængus are as follows: a pot-belly pig on his back, his tummy exposed, winking humorously for onlookers.

== Society hall ==
Euphemian Hall

The original hall was made of brick in the shape of a hexagon. Each side contained a small window for the first floor and a larger window for the second floor. The door was positioned in the same direction as the front of the present hall. Above the door was a marble rhombus which read:

Euphemian Hall

Ζη τη πατριδι χαι τω θεω

1858.

The first floor was used as the library and the second floor was the meeting room.

In 1895, Euphemian Hall began to show structural problems. A vestibule was added to the front of the building at the cost of twelve hundred dollars. This helped support the building somewhat, but it continued to decay. The June 1910 Erskine Board Minutes state that the board had considered acquiring Euphemian Hall as a chapel but decided not to because it had been "condemned as unsafe". On May 12, 1911, the Euphemian minutes read: "This was completed and on account of the cracking of the walls society adjourned without roll call." This was the last meeting in the old Euphemian Hall. The November 1911 Erskine Board minutes state that the building site would be transferred from the Erskine Board of Trustees to the Euphemian Board of Trustees so that they may secure financing for the building. Once this was completed, the property was to revert to the college. The school did not give up the idea of acquiring the old Euphemian Hall. The March 1912 board minutes state that the president presented the matter of purchasing Euphemian Hall for the use of the YMCA.

J. H. Casey designed the new Euphemian Hall, and Judge John Hearst Miller of Alabama and Erskine President James Strong Moffatt contributed most of the money to build the new Hall. It consisted of an auditorium measuring forty-feet-eight inches by thirty-two feet eight inches, two small offices, and a vestibule. The interior walls were to be plastered with a "burlap on plaster wainscot". The building was to have a gas chandelier with two matching fixtures on each wall. Two gas lamps were to be placed on the front steps. The society was to purchase them and the contractor would provide the gas connections. The building was to be placed next to Philomathean Hall. This would have made all the buildings on the Erskine campus arranged in an ell shape. Professor Reid protested this at the March 1912 board meeting. He claimed that this was against the wishes of the Philomathean alumni and members. The board came back that afternoon with the recommendation that the new hall be built on the site of the old hall or on some other site on that side of campus. The building was dedicated during commencement on June 2, 1913. Ira B. Jones, Dr. G. G. Parkinson, and Rev. John Simpson spoke.

In 1976, Mr. and Mrs. Beatty Williams of Florida made a large contribution to the society to renovate Euphemian Hall. The building was rededicated on October 23, 1976. Tom Gettys, former Congressman, was the guest speaker.

== Notable members ==
- Erskine Caldwell - American novelist and short story writer (Honorary)
- Ira B. Jones - Chief Justice of the South Carolina Supreme Court
- Robert E. Lee - Confederate general (Honorary)
- Henry McMaster - Governor of South Carolina (Honorary)
