= Philomathean Literary Society (Erskine College) =

Erskine college's literary society

- ΑΑΣΕΣ
- Philomathean Literary Society seal
- Founded: 1842; 184 years ago Erskine College
- Type: Literary
- Affiliation: Independent
- Status: Active
- Scope: Local
- Motto: Tentare Est Valere "To try is to be worthy"
- Pillars: Brotherhood, Virtue, Wisdom, Hope, Self-Control
- Chapters: 1
- Nickname: Philo
- Headquarters: Due West, South Carolina; United States

The Philomathean Literary Society of Erskine College (ΑΑΣΕΣ) is an all-male student literary society of Erskine College in Due West, South Carolina, United States. It was established in 1842. Its Philomathean Hall is the oldest building in the Erskine College-Due West Historic District. Its sister organization, the Philomelean Society, provides membership to women.

== History ==
=== Predecisors ===
Literary societies were a feature of most American Colleges and Universities in the 19th century. They often existed in pairs so that they could compete for membership and hold debates. Additionally, they served to enhance the liberal arts programs of their schools through discussions on contemporary topics, hosting speakers, and maintaining libraries.

Philomathean is among the most common names chosen for 19th-century literary societies. The oldest existent Philomathean Literary Society in the U.S. is the Philomathean Society at the University of Pennsylvania.

Although Philomathean Literary Societies existed at South Carolina's other schools as early as the 19th century, they have since become defunct or rechartered. Robert Barnwell delivered an oration before the Beaufort Philomathean Society in 1803 to commemorate Independence Day. There was also a Society in Charleston from 1828, it was chartered as Phi Mu in 1904.

=== Erskine College ===
Literary societies followed the foundation of Erskine College almost upon its inception in 1836. As at other colleges, the literary societies served to provide training beyond the scope of the classroom in speech-making, debating, and literature. Their function was to enhance the reputation of the school's liberal arts focus and its prestige by sponsoring famous orators.

The Philomathean Literary Society of Erskine College was formed in 1842 when twelve senior students withdrew from the Euphemian Literary Society. The Philomathean society was conceived as a brother society to the Euphemians to facilitate debates traditional at other literary societies and in the spirit of “iron sharpens iron” taken from Proverbs 27:17. Members of the faculty had participated in literary societies, especially at Miami University, and the tradition was consequently impressed upon students at Erskine.

Ebenezer Erskine Pressly had participated in Literary Societies throughout his education. He attended Miami University in Oxford, Ohio in 1824, where he graduated after 2 years at the age of 18. E.E. Pressly was a member of the Erodelphian Literary Society. In 1827, the Erodelphians, with the Miami Union Literary Society, issued the first collegiate publication west of the Appalachians.

The two Erskine Societies initially met in the college's main building with the Euphemians on the second floor and the Philomatheans on the third floor. Each society was responsible for its hall and library. These libraries were initially the only ones available at the College.

The societies became the center of the social and cultural life of the campus in the 1850s. Weekly meetings and annual exhibitions were held in the shared hall. Every Friday afternoon, the societies held declamations followed by debates in the evening. The highlights of campus life were the Junior Exhibitions, which were social events with young women and members of the community in attendance, and the annual summer commencements, which featured acclaimed orators. The two Societies competed for prestige in honoring commencement orators and politicians with membership.

During the 19th century, many notable American politicians, theologians, and philosophers delivered addresses to the Philomathean Society. In 1844, Benjamin Franklin Perry delivered a speech, published 43 years later by his wife. In 1846, James Lawrence Orr delivered an address at Philomathean Hall which was subsequently published by the Society. The first moderator of the Presbyterian Church, Benjamin M. Palmer, spoke in 1854.

In 1844, the argument over the selection of a commencement orator resulted in the most tragic event of the College's history. In Philomathean Hall, Philomathean Peter K. Thompson was murdered by Euphemian Samuel Miller. The faculty issued an explanation to the local paper:

"Mr. Editor:

A most melancholy occurrence transpired in this place, on the evening of the 6th inst. We allude to an affray between two of the students, Samuel Miller and Peter K. Thompson, which resulted in the death of the latter. To prevent misconception and correct exaggerated reports, we send you a statement of the principal facts in the case. The fatal affair occurred in the hall of the Philomathean Society. At the meeting on last Friday, Mr. Miller, it seems, took offence [sic] at the conduct of Mr. Thompson, during the deliberations of the evening. Immediately after the adjournment of the society some angry words were passed, which resulted in a contest, and the event was the death of Mr. Thompson. It was found to have been occasioned by two stabs inflicted, one on the left side, near the region of the heart, and the other about the abdomen. Mr. Thompson expired in fifteen or twenty minutes after a separation was effected. The wounds were inflicted by a pocket knife, with a blade about three and a half inches in length. The whole affair occupied a period, not, perhaps exceeding half a minute. Mr. Miller has been taken into custody, and the matter is under the process of judicial investigation, which forbids that anything should be said which might be prejudicial to either of the parties. We hope, therefore, that the public will suspend their opinion respecting the whole transaction till all the evidence is brought forward in open court.

By authority of the Faculty"

Miller was subsequently sentenced to 12 months in prison and fined 1000 dollars.

This incident led to the chartering of the two societies. The Philomathean Literary Society received its charter under the State of South Carolina in 1852. From 1854 to 1861, the Euphemian and Philomathean Literary Societies cooperated in the editing and printing of the Erskine Collegiate Recorder. The magazine was the only publication from the college other than the annual catalogs. The content was more or less devoid of politics or social commentary. Instead the Recorder was almost entirely composed of literary essays.

The year the American Civil War ended, too few students enrolled at Erskine to maintain both societies. From 1865 to 1867 they operated jointly as the Adelphian Society, alternating meetings between the Euphemian and Philomathean Halls. The two societies resumed separate operations before the first degree after the Civil War was conferred.

In 1912, the college adopted the Darlington Cup as the award for the school's society debates. The trophy is made of sterling silver from Tiffany & Co. The donation was granted by Philomathean alumnus J. J. Darlington.

== Symbols ==
Philomathean is among the most common names chosen for a society. Philomathean is derived from the Greek philomath, which means "a lover of learning." Members are collectively known as “philo”.

Philomathean Pin

The society's motto is Tentare Est Valere or "To try is to be worthy", along with the letters N D, which stand for Nil Desperandum or "Despair in no way". The letters are derived from Horace's Odes. The motto and letters read together illustrate the classical liberal arts and Christian educational aspirations of the college. The motto is similar to several passages in the Bible, such as Luke 13:24, which state that worth is the result of careful conduct and agonizing effort. Moreover, the letters reinforce the New Testament notion of worth through a classical theme. Teucer undergoes a voyage of discovery and personal suffering, finally establishing the city of Salamis. The theme of his speech is further reinforced by valere, which is also used as a parting phrase. A broad translation of valere also signifies strength, power, and wellness.

The letters of the society are Alpha (Adelphos-Brotherhood); Alpha (Areta- Virtue); Sigma (Sophia- Wisdom); Epsilon (Elpis- Hope); and Sigma (Sophrosuna- Self-Control). The letters offer a code of conduct that reinforces the themes established by the motto. First, brotherhood recalls the core purpose of the society but revisits the story of Teucer who was sent into exile because he failed to honor his brother's death. Virtue recalls biblical passages similar to the motto, advising conduct that follows the example of Christ. Wisdom returns to the motto, playing on one of the meanings of tentare, to prove or to test. Hope reiterates Nil Desperandum. And, self-control recalls the biblical influences of the motto.

== Philomathean Hall ==
Philomathean Hall

The Philomathean Hall is the oldest building in the Erskine College-Due West Historic District. As such, it is a contributing property in the National Register of Historic Places. It was constructed in 1859, under the direction of architect Thomas Veal. The building was constructed in the Italian Renaissance Revival style. The two-story stuccoed building features Corinthian pilasters, a pedimented pavilion, recessed balustrades, and a Palladian window. The Hall demonstrates the influence of Andrea Palladio as it bears close resemblance to the Villa Capra "La Rotonda" and the Villa Porto (Vivaro di Dueville). Palladio's geometrically formulaic design is echoed in the Philomathean Hall's 50x40 footprint, symmetrically placed windows, and interior floor plan that conforms to the window's exterior placement. The open second-floor meeting hall celebrates this geometry with its painted high ceiling, flanking fireplaces, and 14 symmetrically placed windows, while the downstairs rooms are dimensioned to match the window placement, a schematic that still challenges contemporary architects. The architectural similarities between the Hall and colonial American buildings, such as those at Mount Vernon, Monticello, and the White House, are thematic of the early 19th century. Additionally, the Hall is aesthetically tied to other South Carolina buildings. It possesses characteristics similar to those found in Hibernian Hall and Drayton Hall. Leaks in the internal gutter have caused significant damage to the jewel-box painting on the ceiling of the great hall on the second floor, which was added in the 1912 J.J. Darlington renovation. The ceiling and wall frescoes were painted by Italian painter Alfredo Lanzer.

== Activities ==
In the past, the Philomathean Society provided training in declamation, essay writing, oratory, and debating. These skills were tested in competitions. Lower-class members could win medals in declamation and essay writing, while upper-class members could win for oratory and debate. The society still participates in the inter-society debate with the Euphemians for the J. J. Darlington Cup.

The Philomathean Literary Society is associated with several of Erskine College's awards. On an annual basis, the society recognizes a member of the faculty or staff with the Man of the Year Award. The James Steven Henderson Memorial Scholarship is awarded in memory of a 1979 graduate with preference given to members of the society.

The society meets weekly. In years past, the meeting was held on Fridays; the afternoon was reserved for essays and declamations, while the evening was used for debates. Additionally, each member prepared two speeches during the school year. Senior members were presented with sheep-skin diplomas, and members were awarded medals for excellence.

In addition, the society organizes several social functions throughout the year. Some events are organized with the assistance of the Philomelean Society. Specific events have changed since the founding of the society, with new traditions established in place of the old. Alumni accompany Philo women dressed as alumni to join candidate members at an open meeting held early in the school year. This tradition is called the Smoker and intends to expose candidates to the operation of meetings and the advantages of graduating as a member. The Philomeleans host a Halloween costume party, called the Scary Party. A Formal has been held since 1979 when it was first hosted at the Greenwood Country Club. First-year members prepare and serve breakfast at midnight for Senior members at the Midnight Breakfast. The society hosts two events that celebrate American history, the pre-Gay '90s semi-Formal and the Gay '90s outdoor party. The latter is often held at a nearby lake in spring and celebrates the prosperity of the 1890s, a period that saw the North and South reconcile after undergoing Reconstruction. The Society celebrates in the second semester. Finally, at commencement, the Philomathean and Euphemian Societies hold a joint celebration.

The Philomathean and Philomelean members celebrate their member's marital engagements. Members of the Philomathean Society "serenade" engaged Philo women by standing outside her window and singing. During the 1970s a book of songs existed that has since fallen into disuse. Philomeleans slide notes under the doors of their membership inviting them to a "Candle-Lighting". At the time designated by the note, Philo women gather and sing Tell Me Why while passing a burning candle in a circle. When the candle reaches the engaged woman on the second round of the circle, she blows it out and announces her engagement.

== Membership ==
Membership in the Philomathean Society is open to all male students of Erskine College. Women may apply after their first semester to the Philomelean Society.

Alumni retain their membership in the societies and the privileges accorded to members.

== Governance ==
The Philomathean Society operates as a parliament under Robert's Rules of Order. The society has adopted a constitution under which it appoints officers and grants those officers authority. Its officers consist of a President, Vice-President, Recording Secretary, Corresponding Secretary, and Treasurer.

== Notable members ==
- Joseph Neely Miller, a prominent lawyer who was chosen for the Democratic presidential ticket.
- J. J. Darlington was a Washington-based lawyer. A Diana statue in Judiciary Square stands in memorial to him. Darlington was a lawyer for the respondent in Gompers v. Buck's Stove and Range Co
- Leo Hill, elected as the president of the South Carolina Bar at the age of 41, making him the youngest to obtain the post. He is credited with modernizing South Carolina's bond laws and creating the state's Public Defender and Legal Services Agencies.
- John C. Calhoun, honorary member
- James Lawrence Orr, honorary member
