= Tinker Hill =

Mountain in New York, United States

Coordinates: 41°23′38.3″N 73°49′45.5″W

Tinker Hill is a summit in Putnam County, in the U.S. state of New York. It has an elevation of 935 feet (285 m).

The hill was named for the fact that a jack of all trades, or a "tinkering" man, settled there ca. 1800.
