= Johann von Wowern =

Flemish philosopher (1574–1612)

- Born: 10 March 1574
- Died: 30 March 1612 (aged 38)
- Notable work: De Polymathia tractatio: integri operis de studiis veterum

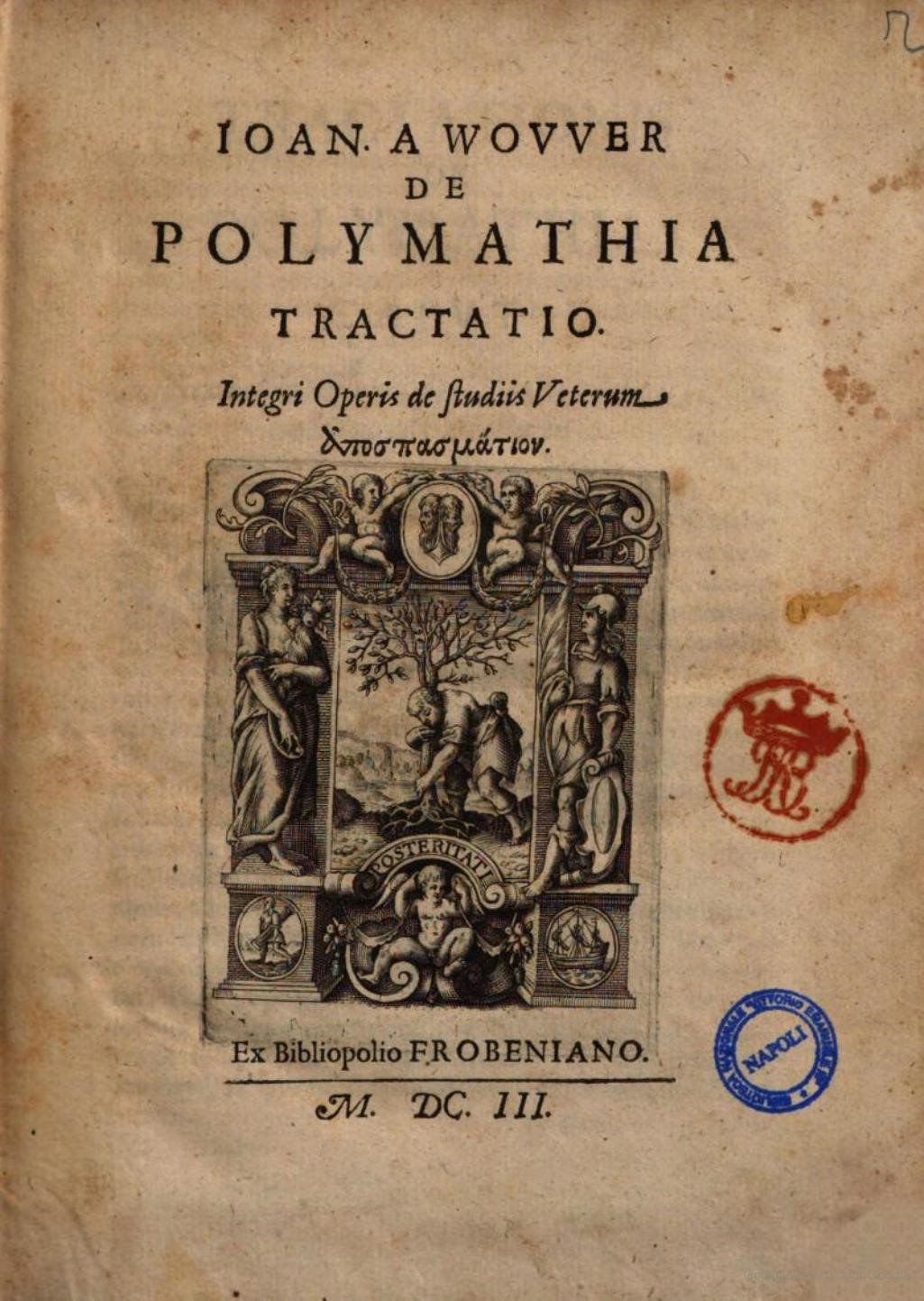
De Polymathia tractatio (1603)

Johann von Wowern was statesman, philologist, and lawyer from the Holy Roman Empire. He is known for his 1603 work De Polymathia tractatio: integri operis de studiis veterum, the first work in Western Europe to use the term "polymath" in its title. Wowern defined polymathy as "knowledge of various matters, drawn from all kinds of studies ... ranging freely through all the fields of the disciplines, as far as the human mind, with unwearied industry, is able to pursue them". Von Wowern lists erudition, literature, philology, philomathy and polyhistory as synonyms.
