= Jack of All Trades =

Jack of All Trades may refer to:

- Jack of all trades, master of none, an aphorism

== Film and television ==
- Jack of All Trades (TV series), American syndicated comedy/action program
- Jack of All Trades (1936 film), 1936 British film starring Jack Hulbert
- Jack of All Trades (2012 film), 2012 Chinese film starring Wang Baoqiang and Eric Tsang
- "Jacks of All Trades", an episode of the American television series Black-ish
- Jack of All Trades, 2018 documentary on sportscards, directed by Stuart Stone

== Music ==
- Jack of All Trades (album), 2007 album by Wildchild
- Jack of All Trades, 2006 album by The Jacka
- "Jack of All Trades", song by Bruce Springsteen from the album Wrecking Ball
- "Jack of All Trades", song by Soul Asylum from Hang Time
- "Jack Of All Trades", song by Midwxst from Summer03
- "Jack of All Trades", song by Beach House from their self-titled album

== Other uses ==
- "Jacks of All Trades", secret society in The Graveyard Book

== See also ==
- Polytehnitis kai erimospitis, 1963 comedy film by Alekos Sakellarios
