= Charles Haldeman =

American novelist

Charles Haldeman (born Heuss; September 27, 1931 – January 19, 1983) was an American novelist.

== Life ==
Haldeman was born in Pickens, South Carolina, to German immigrant Charles Heuss and Frances McFall. Heuss died in March 1935 while the family was living in Syracuse, New York, and his mother moved them back to Pickens. While attending a hotel management school in Washington, D. C., she met and married Willard W. Haldeman, in 1937. Haldeman adopted the boys, changing their last name to his.

The family moved a number of times as Willard Haldeman took different jobs, and lived in Maryland, New York City, and Sackets Harbor, New York (on which Haldeman later modeled the town in his second novel, The Snowman. Haldeman attended thirteen schools in eleven years. After high school, he attended Erskine College as a freshman (1948–49) and Antioch College as a sophomore(1949–50), and the Ringling School of Art in Sarasota, Florida.

He was enlisted into the US Navy in 1950 and served until 1954. After his discharge, he worked briefly in New York City, and then traveled to Europe, where he attended the University of Heidelberg between 1955 and 1957. He then moved to Athens, Greece, where he taught high school biology and algebra at the American Community Schools for two years.

In 1959, he moved to Mikonos, and then to Crete, where he bought and restored a Venetian villa on the waterfront in Chania. He lived on Crete until just before his death. He became friends with Charles Henri Ford and wrote the screenplay for Ford's film, "Johnny Minotaur" (1971).

He also developed friendships with many writers and poets of the time, not least among them Nikos Gatsos, the Greek poet and the American writer Henry Miller. Disturbing the older Miller at work, as a young writer starting out, Miller later wrote, in the Preface to his book “Big Sur and the Oranges of Hieronymus Bosch”: “My warmest thanks go to Charles Haldeman, who came all the way from Winter Park, Florida, to put Wilhelm Fränger's book on Hieronymus Bosch in my hands. May he forgive me for being such a poor host that day!” Peter Levi, the English poet and travel writer, in an interview in 1979 for the Paris Review (Fall 1979, No. 76) talks of having dinner and attempting to write surrealist poetry with both Gatsos and Haldeman: "Toward the end of the evening, Nikos suddenly said, “You know, I remember when we were young, and Surrealism was all the rage, Elytis and I, (Elytis is another Greek poet), there was a game we used to play. Shall we play it?” The result became Levi's poem: Pancakes for the Queen of Babylon. Haldeman is remembered by many as a warm and passionate man interacting with, and often supporting, (despite his often precarious financial situation as a full-time writer) writers and artists and the many travellers he met at that crossroads that both mainland Athens and Hania, Crete, were at that time, for people searching for an answer to some of the world's dilemmas. Following his death, Levi went on to write a long and passionate lament: for Charles Haldeman, (published in Agenda, Vol. 22, Nos. 3-4, 1985) remembering their time together on the seafront in Hania:

There was one café on the empty quay,

it could consume poetry in handfuls

never distracted from the stone quayside.

High overhead under the blazing sun

a snowy mountain rippled like a flag.

In the morning wrote letters for the whores

to their true loves serving in Sicily,

with eyes of blue, far clearer than the sea.

Haldeman provided the lyrics for Manos Hatzidakis' title song for the 1962 film, It Happened in Athens. His screenplay for the film Nicholas was accepted by 20th Century Fox, but production was cancelled after the 1967 "Colonels' coup". He also wrote scripts for a number of British, Greek, and Canadian documentaries. From 1972 to 1974, he served as the editor for International History Magazine. At the time of his death, he and director Christopher Miles were attempting to sell the rights to a film play, The Cretan Runner, based on George Psychoundakis' memoir of the same name.

He died in Athens, Greece in 1983.

== Works ==
Haldeman's first novel, The Sun's Attendant, was published in England in 1963 and in the US in 1964. Its protagonist, Stefan Brückmann, is a half-German, half-Gypsy boy survives Auschwitz and attends the University of Heidelberg as a young man. He becomes involved with a variety of intellectuals and expatriates and is eventually forced to confront his memories and experiences during the war. It was praised by Lawrence Durrell, who had befriended Haldeman in Greece, and George Steiner, who called it "a profoundly original novel." William Gibson's 1964 review for the Saturday Review also concluded his view of the work with the statement: "...how many novelists of this century have reminded men that they may be holy men?"

His second novel, The Snowman (1965), described the odd history and relationship of the inhabitants of a fictional small upstate New York town, Joseph's Landing, in the later part of World War Two. Robert Nye wrote of it in a review for The Guardian, "No American novelist since Faulkner strikes me as having a finer awareness of the possibilities of language as an index to the complications of human behaviour."

Haldeman's third novel, Teagarden's Gang (1971) was an allegorical novel that used a story about Jake Teagarden, a chemist who discovers a quick way to make alcohol and so becomes a powerful mobster in 1920s Prohibition-era Chicago, to comment upon developments in the United States in the late 1960s.

A small collection of poems - without graves - no resurrections - was published posthumously by Five Seasons Press in 1984, with an introduction by Peter Levi. Levi, who died in February 2000, a friend of Haldeman's from their days in Athens together, wrote: "The vivid lightning that flashed here and there in his mind was something he could never put to sleep."

The Paris Review (No. 30, Summer-Fall 1963) also published his short fiction Man is a Wonderful Woundable Animal.

In late 2020, a memoir/short biography of Charles Haldeman was published. Compiled and edited with a commentary by Richard Haldeman, the writer's brother, the 200 page memoir is based on the letters of Charles Haldeman, (“Charles Haldemam’s letters reveal his search for his own identity”) and cover the years 1930 to 1983.

Almost 38 years after his death the book is regarded as intimate portrait of a writer who “sought to understand and separate himself from the racism in his 'family’s American and German heritage, to reconcile the principles of the American dream with the reality of American life, and to help bring about a world in which human beings no longer used 'war as a school for life to build 'monuments to stupidity’"

== Bibliography ==
=== Novels ===
- The Sun's Attendant (1963)
- The Snowman (1965)
- Teagarden's Gang (1971)

=== Poetry ===
- without graves—no resurrections (1984) (foreword by Peter Levi)
