= The Polymath =

2018 non-fiction book by Waqas Ahmed

The Polymath: Unlocking the Power of Human Versatility
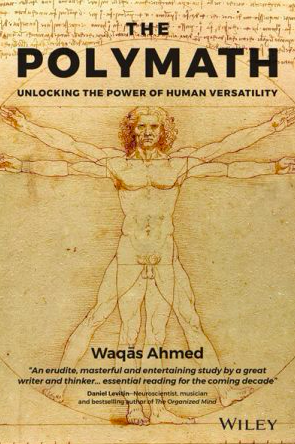
- Author: Waqas Ahmed
- Language: English
- Subject: Polymathy, Intellectual history, Education sciences, Personal development
- Publisher: Wiley
- Publication date: 2018
- ISBN: 978-1-119-50848-9 (1st edition, hardcover)
- OCLC: 1117695960
- Dewey Decimal: 153.9
- LC Class: BF431 .A475 2019
- Website: www.davinci-network.com/the-book

The Polymath: Unlocking the Power of Human Versatility is a non-fiction book by British author Waqas Ahmed, first published in 2018. It argues that specialisation in education and workplaces stifles human curiosity and human potential which naturally transcend subject areas, and that professional institutions have erected walls to keep outsiders out. Ahmed argues that a new approach — one which recognises and fosters versatility — is urgently needed in the modern world. He writes that this would help people both to lead more fulfilling lives and to develop solutions to complex, multi-dimensional problems. The book draws on historical, psychological, and neuroscientific research and profiles living and historical polymaths from many cultures. The cover image of the book is Leonardo da Vinci’s Vitruvian Man—a drawing depicting ideal human bodily proportions based on Leonardo’s interpretation and revision of the aesthetic theories of the Roman architect Vitruvius—as Leonardo is sometimes considered the prototypical renaissance man.

== Background ==
The author Waqas Ahmed is an interdisciplinary scholar, artist, and curator. He is a visiting fellow at the Open University Business School and a faculty member at the London Interdisciplinary School. He is also the former artistic director of the Khalili Collections and the current executive director of the Khalili Foundation. With degrees in economics, international relations and neuroscience, he has previously worked as a diplomatic journalist and editor (editing reports of the Commonwealth Heads of Government Meetings), investment analyst, and fitness trainer. His initial interest in polymathy was spurred by the way university and his early career pressured him to choose between his multiple interests. His diplomatic career and study of international relations involved a lot of travel, including to cultures in which specialisation was not treated as a default. This led to him studying Western culture's emphasis on specialisation and its polymathic alternatives. He noticed that there was no book-length treatment of the topic of polymathy in English.

Ahmed spent five years writing the book, while doing postgraduate research in neuroscience.

== Summary ==
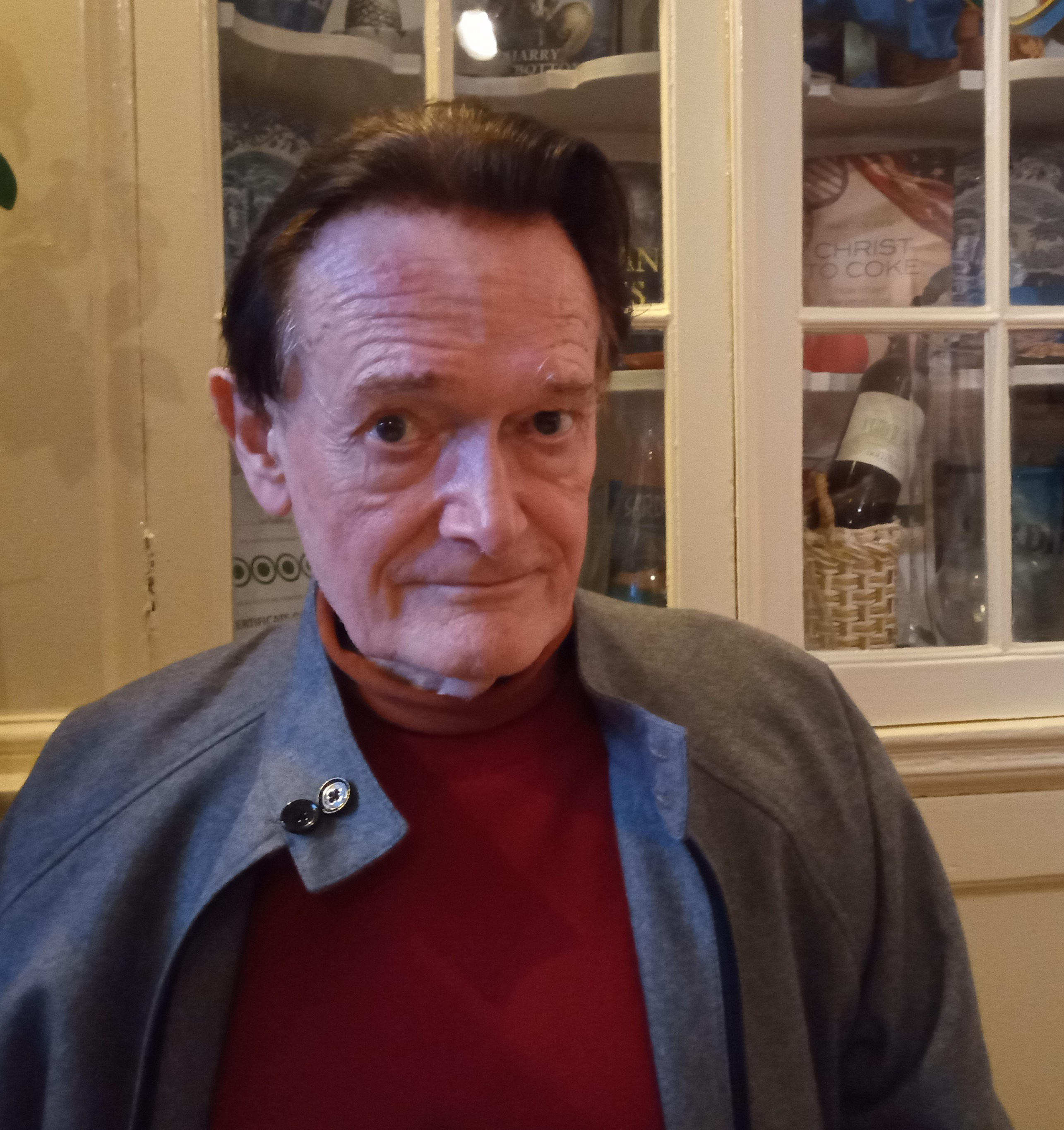
Martin Kemp, author of the book's prologue

The prologue is by the Oxford University professor Martin Kemp, author of many books on the Renaissance polymath Leonardo da Vinci. He has been cited as a leading expert on the topic.

Ahmed takes as his definition of "polymath" those who have made significant contributions to at least three different fields. Rather than seeing polymaths as exceptionally gifted, he argues that every human being has the potential to become one: that people naturally have multiple interests and talents. He contrasts this polymathic nature against what he calls "the cult of specialisation", claiming that education systems stifle this nature by forcing learners to specialise in narrow topics. The book argues that specialisation encouraged by the production lines of the Industrial Revolution is counter-productive both to the individual and wider society. It argues that the complex problems of the 21st century need the versatility, creativity, and broad perspectives characteristic of polymaths.

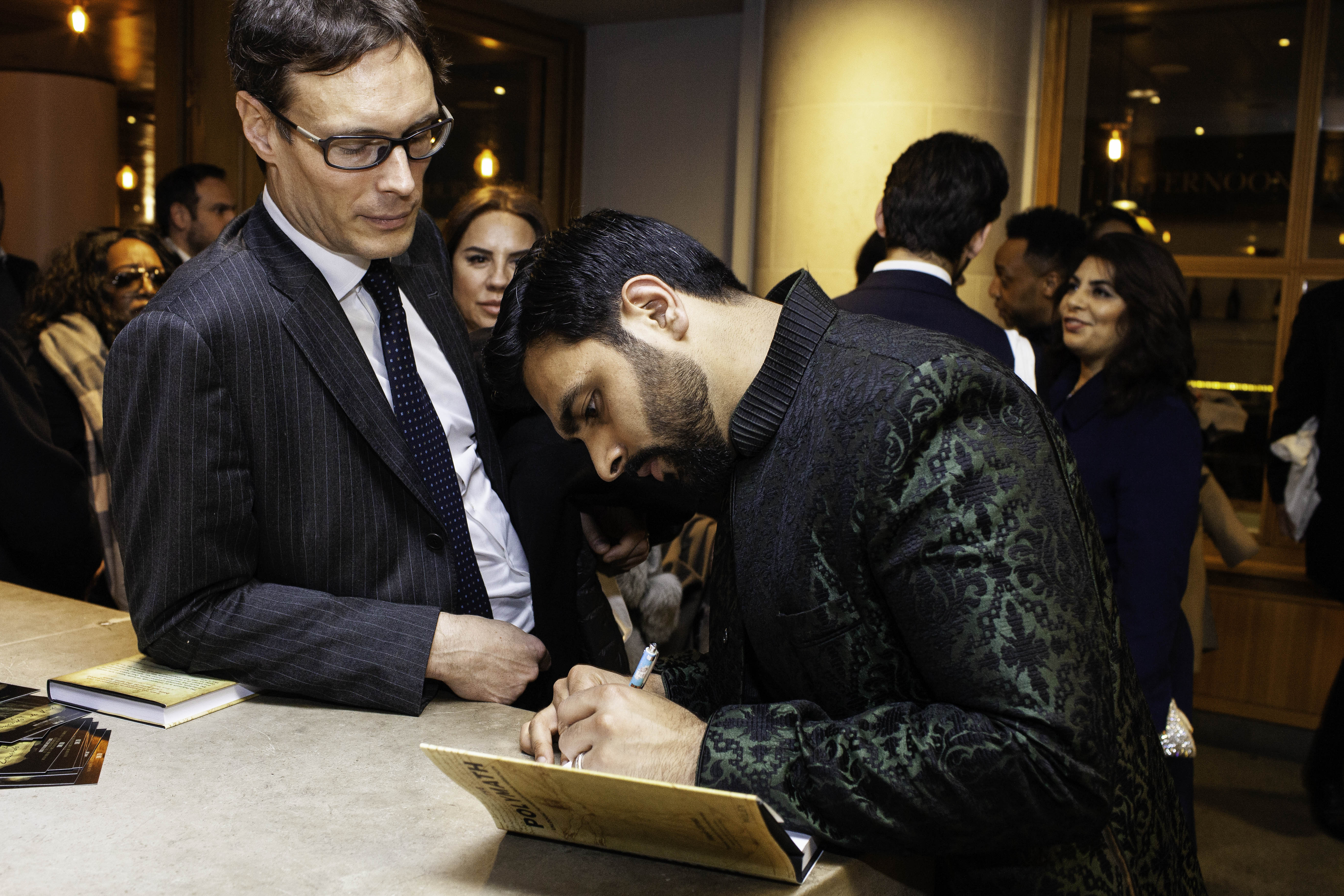
Author Waqas Ahmed signing a copy of the book during its launch at the National Gallery

For individuals, Ahmed says, specialisation is dehumanising and stifles their full range of expression whereas polymathy "is a powerful means to social and intellectual emancipation" which enables a more fulfilling life. In terms of social progress, he argues that answers to specific problems often come from combining knowledge and skills from multiple areas, and that many important problems are multi-dimensional in nature and cannot be fully understood through one specialism. Rather than interpreting polymathy as a mix of occupations or of intellectual interests, Ahmed challenges the dichotomies between "thinkers" and "doers" and between art and science. He argues that an orientation towards action and towards thinking support each other, and that human beings flourish by pursuing a diversity of experiences as well as a diversity of knowledge. He observes that successful people in many fields have cited hobbies and other "peripheral" activities as supplying skills or insights that helped them succeed.

Ahmed examines evidence suggesting that the developing of multiple talents and perspectives is helpful for success in a highly specialised field. He cites a study of Nobel Prize–winning scientists which found them 25 times more likely to sing, dance, or act than average scientists. Another study found that children scored higher in IQ tests after having drum lessons, and he uses such research to argue that diversity of domains can enhance a person's general intelligence.

Ahmed cites many historical claims for the advantages of polymathy. Some of these are about general intellectual abilities that polymaths apply across multiple domains. For example, Aristotle wrote that full understanding of a topic requires, in addition to subject knowledge, a general critical thinking ability that can assess how that knowledge was arrived at. Another claimed advantage of a polymathic mindset is in the application of multiple approaches to understanding a single issue. Ahmed cites the biologist E. O. Wilson's view that reality is approached not by a single academic discipline but via a consilience between them. One argument for studying multiple approaches is that it would lead to open-mindedness. Within any one perspective, a question may seem to have a straightforward, settled answer. The argument presented is that someone aware of different, contrasting answers will be more open-minded and aware of the limitations of their own knowledge. The importance of recognising these limitations is a theme that Ahmed finds in many thinkers, including Confucius, ʿAlī ibn Abī Ṭālib, and Nicolas of Cusa. He calls it "the essential mark of the polymath." A further argument offered for multiple approaches is that a polymath does not see diverse approaches as diverse, because they see connections where other people see differences. For example, Leonardo da Vinci advanced multiple fields by applying mathematical principles to each.

Throughout the book there are short profiles of historical and living polymaths from many cultures and historical periods, including Aristotle, Nasir al-Din al-Tusi, Ban Zhao, Suleiman the Magnificent, and Florence Nightingale. One chapter is based on interviews with living polymaths.

Aristotle

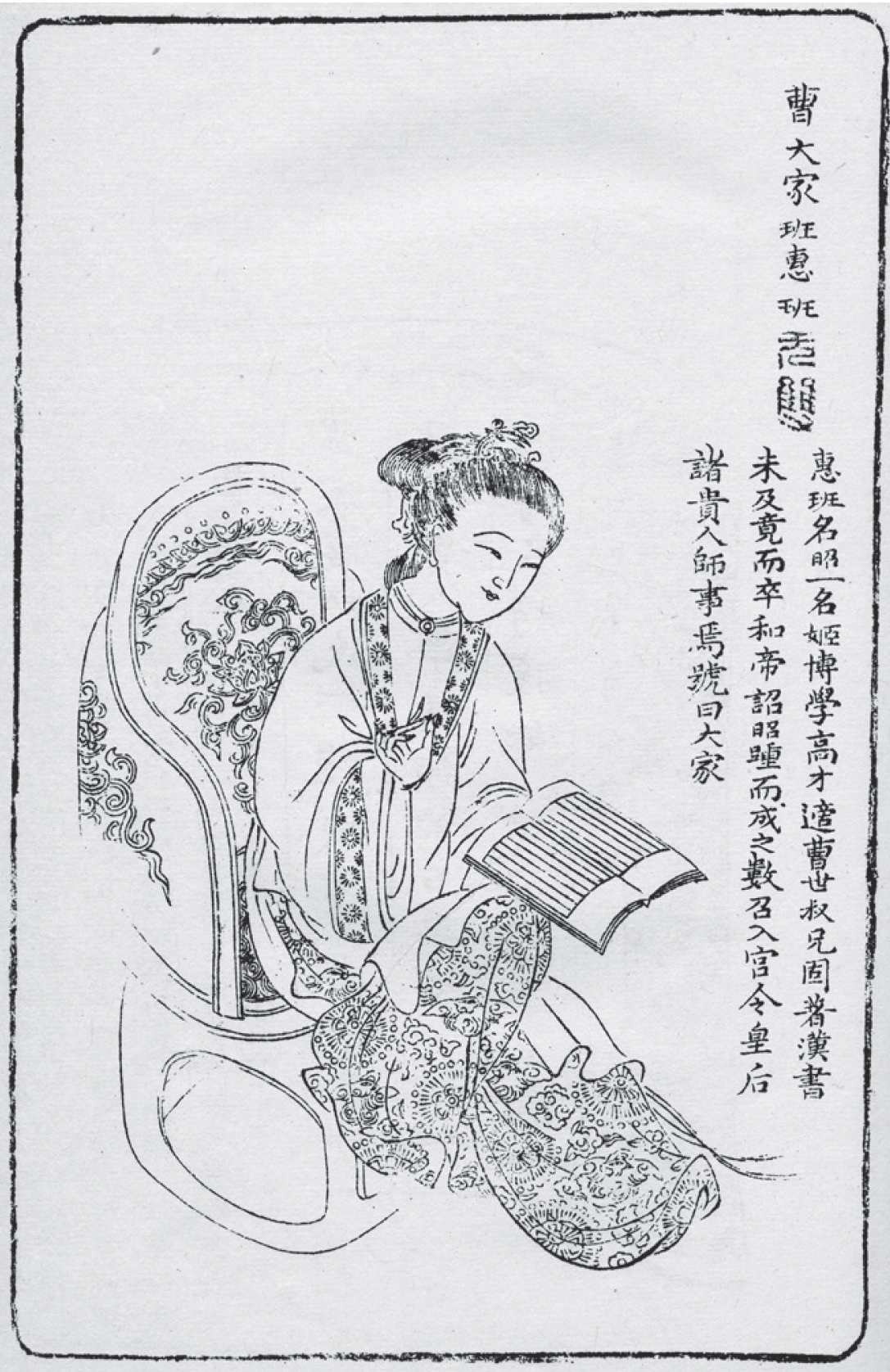
Ban Zhao

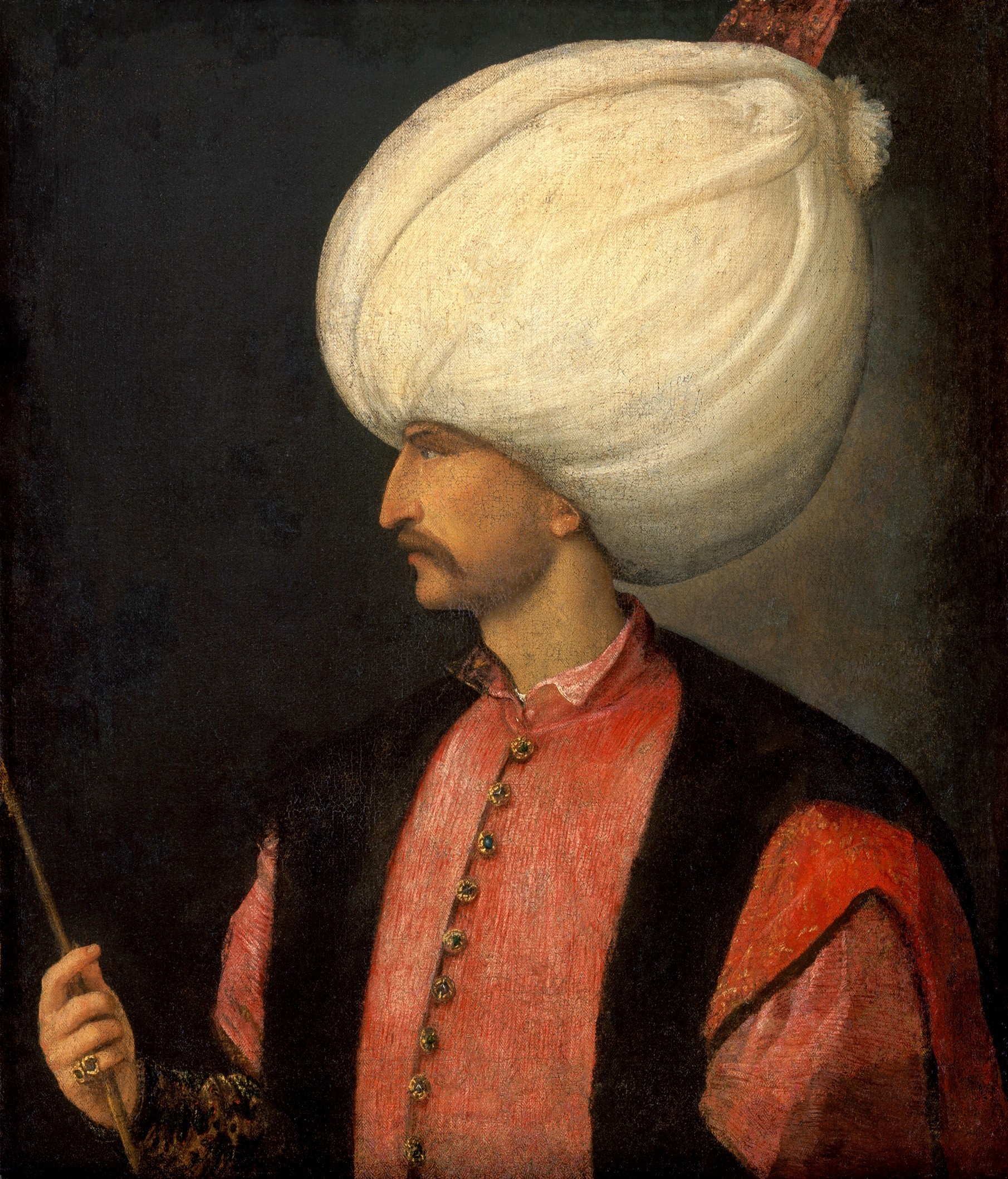
Suleiman the Magnificent

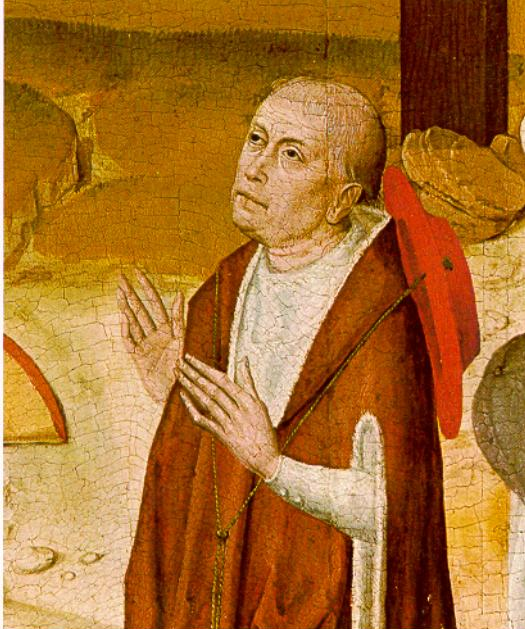
Nicholas of Cusa

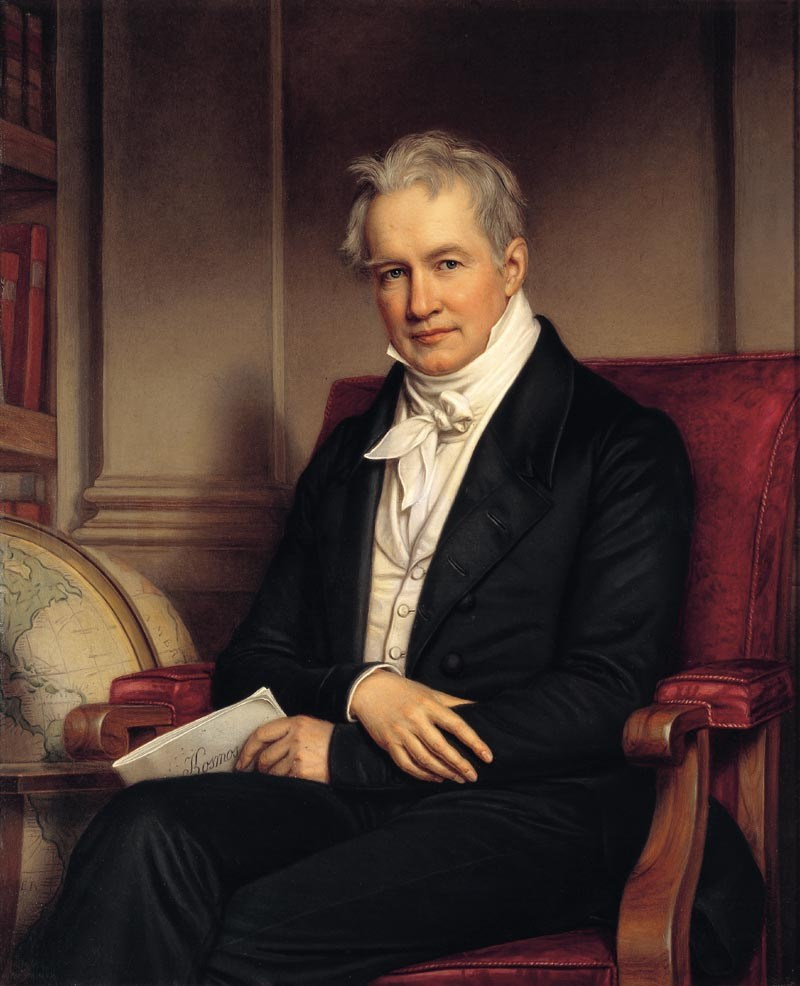
Alexander von Humboldt

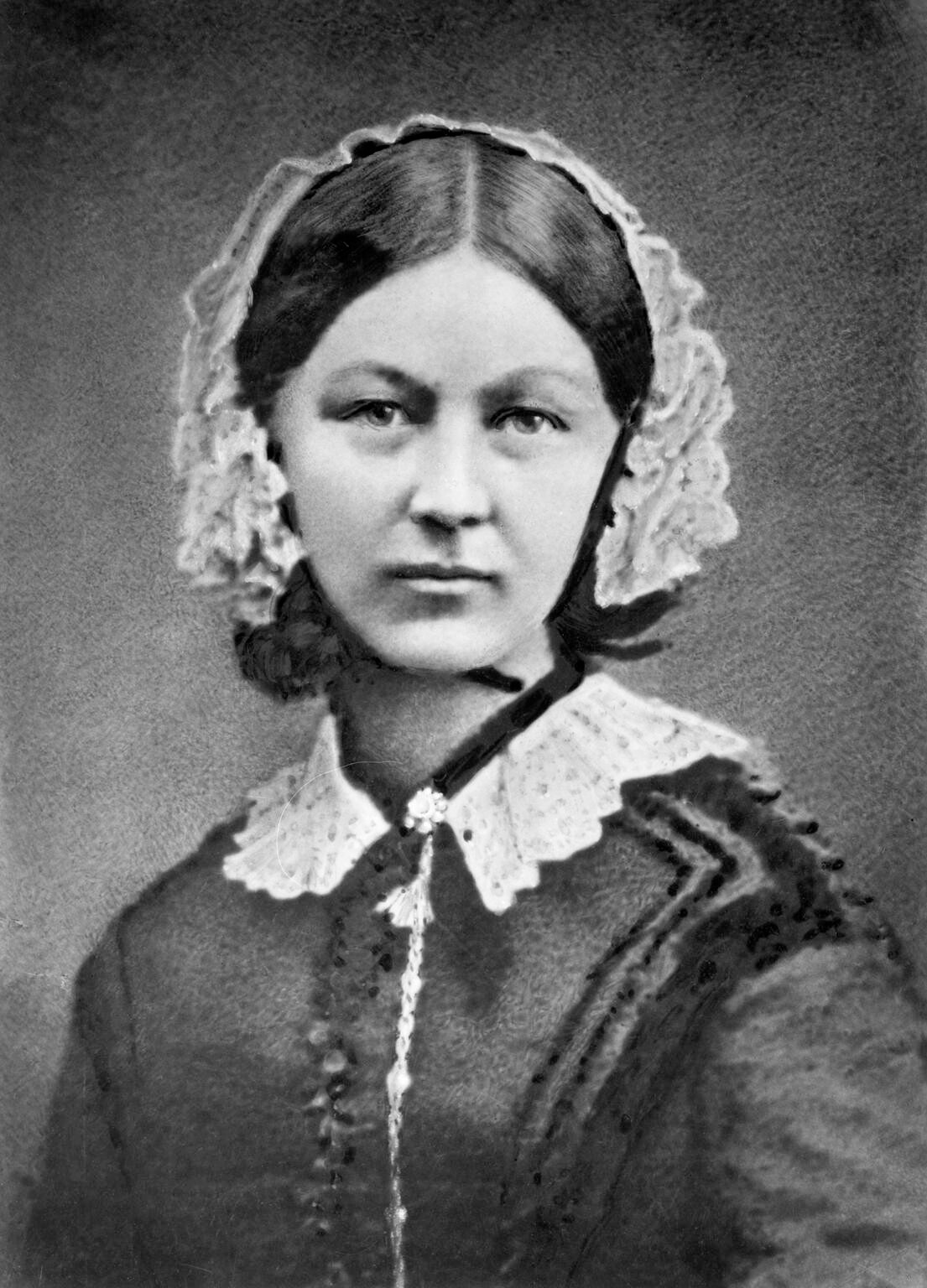
Florence Nightingale

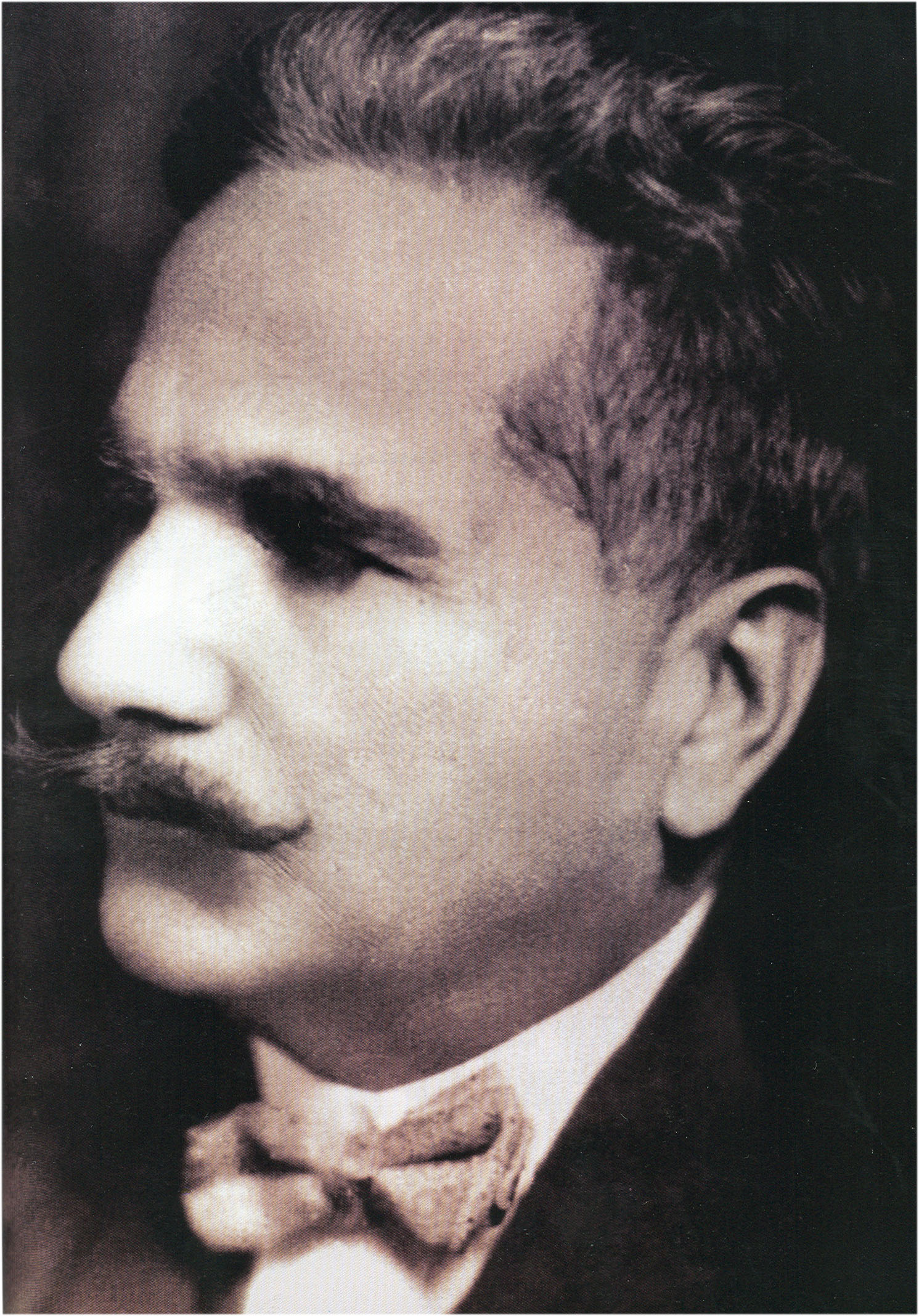
Muhammad Iqbal

Some historical polymaths mentioned in the book

== Reception ==
Reviewers were generally in agreement with the book's argument. Andrew Hill, reviewing The Polymath in the Financial Times, agreed that human beings are naturally polymathic and that it is harmful for society to discourage this. The magazine Jocks & Nerds described The Polymath as a "fascinating" book that "makes a compelling argument". In M3 India, the surgeon Kamal Mahawar endorsed the case Ahmed makes for polymathy both as an approach to personal fulfilment and as a set of reforms to education and the workplace.

In The Lancet, Andrew Robinson described the book as "pioneering" for its focus on polymathy, in contrast to the many books that have been written on genius. BBC Worklife described the book as "one of the most detailed examinations of the subject". The Globsyn Management Journal described the book as "brilliant reading" that combines a narrative of polymaths in history with a vision of society's potential future evolution.

In response to interest in the book from cultural and educational institutions, Ahmed organised a Polymath Festival "designed to celebrate many-sided human potential and explore interdisciplinary solutions to complex world problems."

== Editions ==
Originally written in English and published by Wiley in print, ebook and audiobook formats, The Polymath has been translated into Korean.
