= Multipotentiality =

Ability to excel in two or more different fields

Multipotentiality is an educational and psychological term referring to the ability and preference of a person, particularly one of strong intellectual or artistic curiosity, to excel in two or more different fields.

Depiction of the workplace of a "multipontentialite".

It can also refer to an individual whose interests span multiple fields or areas, rather than being strong in just one. Such traits are called multipotentialities, while "multipotentialites" has been suggested as a name for those with this trait.

By contrast, those whose interests lie mostly within a single field are called "specialists".

== History ==
=== Etymology ===
An early instance of the term in the record comes from relevant research in giftedness.

In 1972, R.H. Frederickson et al. defined a multipotentialed person as someone who, "when provided with appropriate environments, can select and develop a number of competencies to a high level".

On October 22, 2008, Douglas Hannay began a blog that lasted some eight years. His first blog referred to multipotentializing as excelling in multiple fields of energy. The blog was then copied in its entirety to Facebook on September 22, 2016, after viewing Emilie Wapnick's TED talk on being a multipotentialite during October 2015.

In 2010, multipotentiality appeared again in Tamara Fisher's article in Education Week. She defines it thus:

Multipotentiality is the state of having many exceptional talents, any one or more of which could make for a great career for that person.

— Tamara Fisher, Education Week

During 2015, Emilie Wapnick coined the term "multipotentialite", perhaps to establish a shared identity for the community. They define it this way:

A multipotentialite is someone with many interests and creative pursuits.

Although multipotentialite is a modern term, the idea of someone with many passions is not new. Any student of history often hears mention of polymaths or Renaissance people. Multipotentialites have, indeed, existed as long as human societies.

While the strengths of multipotentialites are not always appreciated in post-industrial capitalist societies, there have been times throughout history when being well-versed in multiple disciplines was considered the ideal. And, of course, multipotentiality is highly valued in certain spaces, contexts and cultures today.

When multipotentialites are supported and encouraged to embrace their diverse skills and experiences, they're able to tap into their super powers: idea synthesis, rapid learning, adaptability, big picture thinking, relating to and translating between different types of people, "languages", and modes of thought.

The ability to draw from and integrate a range of diverse ideas makes multipotentialites particularly well-suited to solving complex, multifactorial problems. And, their unconventional backgrounds help them develop unique voices and contribute fresh perspectives wherever they go.

— Emilie Wapnick, Terminology, Puttylike

=== Relevant terminology ===
While the term "multipotentialite" is often used interchangeably with polymath or Renaissance Person, the terms are not identical. One need not be an expert in any particular field to be a multipotentialite.

Indeed, Isis Jade makes a clear distinction between multipotentiality and polymaths. Multipotentiality refers simply to one's potential in multiple fields owing to his/her diverse interests and attempts. Polymaths, on the other hand, are distinguished by their mastery and expertise in several fields. In this sense, multipotentialites can be viewed as potential polymaths.

Other terms used to refer to multipotentialites are "scanners", "slashers", "generalist", "multipassionate", "RP2", and "multipods", among others.

=== Context ===
With the advent of the industrial age, cultural norms have shifted in favor of specialization. Indeed, in the modern day, the more narrow the specialization, the higher the pay and respect accorded, for example: PhD graduates, and specialized lawyers, doctors, and engineers. The aphorism Jack of all trades, master of none emphasizes this. Older emphasis towards generalism and multiple potentials such as Renaissance humanism and the Renaissance man were replaced.

However, the convergence economy, Internet age, connectivity, the rise of the Creative Class, and other modern developments are bringing about a return of a more positive opinion for generalists and multipotentialites.

In Specialization, Polymaths And The Pareto Principle In A Convergence Economy, Jake Chapman writes:

Economists tell us that the history of human labor is one of continually increasing specialization. In the days of the hunter-gatherer, every member of the tribe would have been expected to command some degree of proficiency with each task.

As we progressed along the economic continuum from hunter-gatherer through agrarian and industrial and now into post-industrial economies, the labor force has become more fragmented, with workers having more and more specialized skill sets. ... Historically, specialization has been a path to prosperity. Although specialization has certain economic advantages, in the era of technological convergence, well-educated generalists will be those who are the most valuable. It is time for a renaissance of the "Renaissance Man". ... The Renaissance thinkers recognized both the potential of individuals as well as the enormous value to being well-rounded. Unfortunately, somewhere along the way the idea of someone who dabbled in many fields lost its cultural appeal and we began to praise those who sought deep subject matter expertise.

We now live in a world where distinctions between formerly separate industries are breaking down and the real opportunities for growth are where those industries intersect. Harnessing these 21st-century opportunities will require people who are "jacks of all trades, masters of none", or, perhaps more accurately, master polymaths.

— Jake Chapman

=== Business ===
Organizations such as startups that require adaptability and holding multiple roles can employ several multipotentialites and have one specialist as a resource.

In Specialization, Polymaths And The Pareto Principle In A Convergence Economy, Chapman said:

In the modern world, where a very common job might require someone to be a social-media expert, public speaker, writer and data analyst, the polymath wins and the deep subject-matter expert is relegated to a back corner to be used as a resource for others. As an investor, if I were going to pick the perfect team, it would be a group of rock-star polymaths with a single subject matter expert as a resource.

— Jake Chapman, In Specialization, Polymaths And The Pareto Principle In A Convergence Economy

Stretch Magazine discusses the role of multipotentialites in organizations and how they will believe they will be more in demand in the future.

=== Criticism of specialization ===
Historical context, current conventional wisdom, comparative advantage, USP, among others contribute to the wide acceptance of specialization.

Proponents of specialization above cite excellence and its perceived higher rewards compared to mediocrity in everything. Proponents of multiple capabilities below emphasize the importance of adaptability.

In "Master of Many Trades", Robert Twigger goes so far as to coin the word "monopath": "It means a person with a narrow mind, a one-track brain, a bore, a super-specialist, an expert with no other interests — in other words, the role-model of choice in the Western world."

This sentiment is not new. In Time Enough for Love (1973), Robert A. Heinlein wrote:

A human being should be able to change a diaper, plan an invasion, butcher a hog, conn a ship, design a building, write a sonnet, balance accounts, build a wall, set a bone, comfort the dying, take orders, give orders, cooperate, act alone, solve equations, analyze a new problem, pitch manure, program a computer, cook a tasty meal, fight efficiently, die gallantly. Specialization is for insects.

— Robert A. Heinlein, Time Enough for Love

In an article on the decline of polymathy, Felipe Fernández-Armesto wrote, "Universities bear some responsibility for its extinction. Classical Greece, Renaissance Italy and Victorian England all revered and rewarded generalists, for whom today universities have little or no space or patience. Enclosed departments in discrete spaces, with their own journals and jargons, are a legacy of lamentable, out-of-date ways of organising knowledge and work."

== Impact ==
In a world that overvalues specialization, the term and its increasing popularity (especially among the blogging community) have contributed to the revival of awareness on the importance of generalists. It was even used in a competition's training session.

In the current economy, Creativity and the rise of the Creative Class are linked to divergent thinking and innovative solutions to current problems. Because new ideas can be found in the intersection of multiple fields, they would benefit from the advantages of multipotentialites.

== See also ==
- Polymath
- Renaissance humanism
- Jack of all trades
- Generalist (disambiguation)
- Speed learning
- Creative Class
- Creativity
