= William Bell Montgomery =

American farmer and businessman (1829–1904)

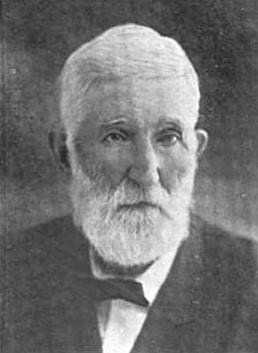
- Born: August 21, 1829; Fairfield County, South Carolina
- Died: September 25, 1904 (aged 75); Starkville, Mississippi
- Education: Erskine College & Princeton University
- Occupations: farmer and editor
- Parent(s): Hugh & Isabella Montgomery

William Bell Montgomery (August 21, 1829 – September 25, 1904) was an American farmer, businessman, and editor of farming periodicals.

== Early life and education ==
He was born in Fairfield District, South Carolina, on August 21, 1829, the son of Hugh and Isabella Montgomery. When he was six years old his family and a number of their relatives and friends moved to Oktibbeha County, Mississippi, near Starkville. His father was a pioneer surveyor as well as farmer. Both his parents' families were Associate Reformed Presbyterians, and when the Associate Reformed Presbyterian Church was organized in Starkville in 1840, David Montgomery was one of the first two elders in the church.

Around 1846, Montgomery returned to South Carolina to attend Erskine College, and left that institution c. 1848. He completed his college training at the College of New Jersey where he graduated in 1850.

== Career ==
After some years in agriculture in Mississippi, he became a cotton broker in Mobile, Alabama, where he lived until after the American Civil War. Although he had been opposed to the war and took no active part in it, he was loyal to the South.

In 1865, his health forced him to return to Mississippi where his mother and many of his relatives lived, and he became a model farmer. He introduced new grasses, as well as introducing a herd of Jersey cattle from the Isle of Jersey in the English Channel, and for over three decades was an agricultural leader in Oktibbeha County and northern Mississippi. Montgomery is credited with revolutionizing agriculture in northern Mississippi.

After a fire swept through Starkville on April 25, 1875, destroying 52 buildings, Montgomery proved to be one of the area's strongest promoters.

=== Work in education and literature ===
Montgomery Hall, Mississippi State University

In 1870, he founded the Starkville Female Institute which was later taken over by the city of Starkville as the public school. In 1875, he founded the Livestock Journal as its editor, publisher, and owner. The following year he began the publication of the Southern Livestock Journal which was edited by his son, and for a time it ranked as a leading agricultural magazine in the South. The Southern Livestock Journal later became the Southern Farm Gazette and eventually merged with the Progressive Farmer.

When the Agricultural and Mechanical College of Mississippi (now known as Mississippi State University) was established in 1878, Montgomery was a leader in securing it for Starkville, and for 26 years he served as the local trustee for the college. Montgomery Hall on the campus of Mississippi State is named for Montgomery.

== Later years ==
Montgomery died September 25, 1904, in Starkville, Mississippi. A portrait of him by Arthur L. Bairnsfather was included in the Hall of Fame in the Mississippi Capitol established in 1903.
