= Li Zhengming =

Chinese chemist (1931–2021)

- 李正名
- Born: 2 January 1931; Shanghai, Republic of China
- Died: 4 October 2021 (aged 90); Tianjin, People's Republic of China
- Education: Erskine College; Nankai University
- Scientific career
- Fields: Organic chemistry Agricultural pharmacy
- Workplaces: Nankai University

Li Zhengming (Chinese: 李正名; pinyin: Lǐ Zhèngmíng; 2 January 1931 – 4 October 2021) was a Chinese engineer who was a professor at Nankai University, and an academician of the Chinese Academy of Engineering.

== Biography ==
Li was born into an intellectual family in Shanghai, on 2 January 1931, during Republic of China. His grandfather Li Weige (李维格) was an industrialist and educated in the United Kingdom. His father Li Zhongdao (李中道) graduated from the University of Michigan and his mother graduated from the University of Illinois, both were professors at Soochow University and then Fudan University. His uncle Li Fuji was a physicist graduating from the University of Bonn, and another uncle Li Zhongyong (李中庸) was a doctor and an alma mater of the University of Berlin. He secondary studied at the High School Affiliated Soochow University. In 1949, he arrived in the United States to begin his education at the Department of Chemistry, Erskine College. In 1951, the United States Citizenship and Immigration Services issued an order prohibiting Chinese students from leaving the United States. He was helped by the then president, Dr. R. C. Grier, who wrote a letter to the senators of South Carolina. At the end of 1952, Li Zhengming was finally approved to return China. After earning the Bachelor of Chemistry degree and the E. L. Reid Chemistry Prize, he returned to China as one of the first batch of returned students by boat. In August 1953, he did his postgraduate work at Nankai University under the supervision of Yang Shixian (杨石先).

After graduating in 1956, he stayed at the university and worked successively as an instructor (1956–1962), associate professor (1962–1979), full professor (1982–1996), and deputy dean of the School of Chemistry (1994–1998). In 1997, he became director of National Engineering Research Center for Pesticides, and served until 2014.

On 4 October 2021, he died from an illness in Tianjin, aged 90.

== Honours and awards ==
- 1987 State Natural Science Award (Second Class)
- 1990 State Science and Technology Progress Award (Second Class)
- 1991 State Science and Technology Progress Award (First Class)
- 1992 State Science and Technology Progress Award (Second Class)
- 1993 State Science and Technology Progress Award (First Class)
- 1994 State Science and Technology Progress Award (Third Class)
- 1995 Member of the Chinese Academy of Engineering (CAE)
- 1999 State Science and Technology Progress Award (Second Class)
- 2007 State Technological Invention Award (Second Class)
