= Todd Kincannon =

American attorney, activist, and alleged dog killer

- Born: James John Todd Kincannon; June 12, 1981 (age 45)
- Education: Greenville Technical College (AS); Erskine College (BS); University of South Carolina School of Law (JD)
- Occupations: Attorney, political activist, election worker
- Known for: Political commentary
- Political party: Republican
- Spouse: Ashely Suzanne Griffith

James John Todd Kincannon (born June 12, 1981) is an American attorney and political activist known for his statements made regarding political issues and current events. His license to practice law was suspended in August 2015. In 2018, Kincannon made headlines when he was arrested for killing his mother's dog and claiming to be the second coming of Christ.

== Early life and education ==
Kincannon grew up in Simpsonville, South Carolina. Kincannon attended Greenville Technical College, and graduated with an Associate degree in 1999. Kincannon then transferred to Erskine College, and graduated with 3 bachelor's degrees in Chemistry, Physics, and Mathematics in 2002.

Kincannon earned a J.D. from the University of South Carolina School of Law in 2007, where he was a member of the South Carolina Law Review, the Order of the Barristers, and the Moot Court.

== Career ==
Kincannon briefly held the position of executive director of the South Carolina Republican Party, resigning after three months.

=== Court cases ===
Kincannon has been involved in a variety of high-profile election protests in South Carolina, several of which have been appealed to the South Carolina Supreme Court. The most notable of these is Gecy v. Bagwell, 642 S.E.2d 569 (S.C. 2007). This case was argued before the South Carolina Supreme Court, which unanimously reversed the circuit court order and affirmed the order of the Simpsonville Election Commission which ordered a new election.

Another notable election protest involving Kincannon was Horton v. Elliott, where Kincannon was qualified as an expert witness with respect to election practices and procedures. In Horton v. Elliott, Kincannon offered extensive expert testimony as to the requirements of the Voting Rights Act and the standards for overturning elections in South Carolina.

=== Public comments ===
==== Public statements on Ebola ====
During the Ebola epidemic of 2014, Kincannon made public his belief that all people infected with the disease (including US citizens) should immediately be executed:

The protocol for a positive Ebola test should be immediate humane execution and sanitization of the whole area. That will save lives." "There's just no other way with Ebola. We need to be napalming villages from the air right now." "People with Ebola in the US need to be humanely put down immediately"

==== Via Twitter ====
===== 2013 =====
A number of media outlets detailed a range of inflammatory messages he posted to his Twitter account in 2013, which include mocking Florida shooting victim Trayvon Martin and saying that transgender people should be placed in a concentration camp. He also posted to his Twitter account that it was "a shame" that Michael Prysner, an Iraq War veteran turned anti-war organizer, "didn't come home in a body bag." His Twitter account was suspended in late 2013.

===== 2014 =====
In early 2014, he created a new Twitter account named "Todd__Kincannon", on which he allegedly made sexist and homophobic statements, many referencing Texas gubernatorial candidate Wendy Davis in defamatory ways. The traditionalist conservative author Rod Dreher highlighted tweets in which Kincannon, identifying himself as a Southern Baptist, labeled Dreher (who is Eastern Orthodox) a "papist" and compared infant baptism to Chinese water torture. He also received backlash for boasting to the father of Sergeant Bowe Bergdahl that he would attempt to convince the attorney general to pursue capital punishment for his son. In September 2014, Kincannon tweeted that football player Ray Rice was justified in beating his fiancé. In October of the same year, Kincannon posted a series of tweets advocating the murder of anyone contracting the Ebola virus, and blaming "the people of Africa" for its spread: "They could stop eating each other and learn calculus at any time".

== Legal and criminal issues ==
=== Alleged domestic abuse ===
On March 28, 2015, the alternative weekly Charleston City Paper reported that on March 26, the Lexington County Sheriff’s Department dispatched to the Kincannon residence in response to "a possible domestic incident." According to the police report, Kincannon and his wife Ashely Griffith got into a fight in their car. When Griffith attempted to exit the vehicle in a Chick-fil-A parking lot, Kincannon allegedly grabbed Griffith's arm and accelerated, to which Griffith rolled down the window in hopes a bystander would hear and intervene. She then proceeded to make calls to her mother, and attempted to make an open-line 9-1-1 call. The report further stated Kincannon "threatened he would drive the car into a concrete barrier if the cops became involved" and "threatened to kill himself if Ashely left." Griffith told authorities their relationship has "a history of unreported domestic violence," including threats of suicide and threats of physical harm to Griffith and her family.

Kincannon said he "accidentally overdosed" and claimed his behavior was a side effect of benzonatate, which he was prescribed for an upper respiratory infection. In light of the suicide threats, he was sent to the Lexington Medical Center for further evaluation.

On April 6, 2015, Kincannon was arrested in Lexington, SC for criminal domestic violence (CDV).

=== Revocation of law license ===
Kincannon had his license to practice law revoked on August 28, 2015, by the South Carolina Supreme Court. The revocation generated from Kincannon's engaging in unbecoming antics in court and sending a variety of threatening and disturbing emails and faxes to people related to the court processes.

=== Dog-killing incident ===
Early on July 26, 2018, police responded to a call from Kincannon's father who stated that Todd Kincannon had killed the family dog "with his bare hands." Police found Todd Kincannon shirtless and covered in blood and dog hair on the front steps of his parents' home, claiming to be “the second coming of Christ.” According to a police incident report, officers found "a deceased dog in the kitchen that appeared to have suffered numerous stab wounds and was laying in a large pool of blood." Kincannon was taken by police to Greenville Memorial Hospital for psychological evaluation. He was later charged with ill treatment of animals.". Police reported that the S.C. Attorney General has said no bond will be set for Kincannon.
