= Jay West =

American politician

Member of the South Carolina House of Representatives from the 7th district
- In office December 6, 2016 – November 11, 2024
- Preceded by: Michael Gambrell
- Succeeded by: Lee Gilreath

Personal details
- Born: John Taliaferro West IV; November 29, 1964 (age 61) Anderson, South Carolina, U.S.
- Party: Republican (2016–present); Democratic (2004)
- Spouse: Jennifer Brice
- Education: Erskine College (BS, MS, PhD)

John Taliaferro "Jay" West IV (born November 29, 1964) is an American politician. He is a former member of the South Carolina House of Representatives from the 7th District, serving from 2016 to 2024. He is a member of the Republican Party.

== Electoral history ==
Date	Election	Candidate	Party	Votes	%
South Carolina Senate, 4th district
Nov 2, 2004	General	William H. O'Dell	Republican	17,417	62.27
Nov 2, 2004	General	John T. West IV	Democratic	10,546	37.70
Nov 2, 2004	General	Write Ins		9	0.03
South Carolina House of Representatives, 7th district
Nov 8, 2016	General	John T. West IV	Republican	10,566	99.31
Nov 8, 2016	General	Write Ins		73	0.69
Nov 8, 2016	General	Michael Gambrell won election to Senate; seat stayed Republican			
Nov 6, 2018	General	John T. West IV	Republican	8,201	98.56
Nov 6, 2018	General	Write Ins		120	1.44
Nov 3, 2020	General	John T. West IV	Republican	12,280	76.15
Nov 3, 2020	General	Andrea Bejarano-Robinson	Democratic	3,833	23.77
Nov 3, 2020	General	Write Ins		13	0.08
