= Michael Gambrell =

American politician (born 1958)

Member of the South Carolina Senate from the 4th district
- Incumbent
- Assumed office May 24, 2016
- Preceded by: Billy O'Dell

Member of the South Carolina House of Representatives from the 7th district
- In office December 5, 2006 – May 24, 2016
- Preceded by: Ronnie Townsend
- Succeeded by: Jay West

Personal details
- Born: Michael Wayne Gambrell; January 10, 1958 (age 68) Belton, South Carolina, U.S.
- Party: Republican
- Spouse: Renee V. Gambrell (m. 1990)
- Education: Clemson University (BS)
- Occupation: Entrepreneur; politician

Michael Wayne Gambrell (born January 10, 1958) is an American politician and businessman who has represented South Carolina's 4th Senate District since 2016. A member of the Republican Party, he previously served in the South Carolina House of Representatives from the 7th District from 2006 to 2016.

== Early life and education ==
Gambrell was born January 10, 1958 in Belton, South Carolina to Aaron and Robbie Gambrell. He graduated with a B.S. from Clemson University in 1980.

== S.C. House of Representatives (2006-2016) ==
Gambrell served in the South Carolina House of Representatives from 2006 through 2016, representing the 7th district (parts of Anderson County).

In 2015, in the wake of the Charleston church shooting, Governor Nikki Haley called on the state legislature to open debate about the removal of the Confederate flag from the grounds of the South Carolina Capitol. Gambrell was in the minority of members who voted against opening debate. In July 2015, Haley signed a bill into law authorizing the flags removal.

== S.C. Senate ==
Gambrell was first elected to the South Carolina Senate during a special election in 2016 when incumbent William H. O'Dell died in office. He has represented South Carolina's 4th Senate district (portions of Abbeville, Anderson, and Greenwood Counties).

In 2022, Gambrell voted for the Fetal Heartbeat Act, legislation that banned abortion in the state after six-weeks.

== Personal life ==
Gambrell is self-employed at M&R Enterprises.

== Electoral history ==
Year	Office	Type	Party	Main opponent	Party	Votes for Gambrell				Result	Swing	Ref.
Year	Office	Type	Party	Main opponent	Party	Total	%	P.	±%	Result	Swing	Ref.
2006	S.C. Representative	Rep. primary	Republican	Dan Harvell	Republican	1,477	53.83%	1st	N/A	Won	N/A	
2006	S.C. Representative	General	Republican	Ron Gilreath	Democratic	4,300	56.04%	1st	N/A	Won	Hold	
2008	S.C. Representative	General	Republican	Richard Kelly	Democratic	8,232	70.26%	1st	+14.22%	Won	Hold	
2010	S.C. Representative	General	Republican	Write-in	N/A	6,216	99.58%	1st	+29.32%	Won	Hold	
2012	S.C. Representative	General	Republican	Write-in	N/A	9,457	99.31%	1st	-0.27%	Won	Hold	
2014	S.C. Representative	General	Republican	Write-in	N/A	6,290	99.59%	1st	+0.28%	Won	Hold	
2016	S.C. Senator	Rep. primary	Republican	Rockey Burgess	Republican		45.50%	1st	N/A	Won	N/A	
2016	S.C. Senator	Rep. primary runoff	Republican	Rockey Burgess	Republican		57.00%	1st	N/A	Won	N/A	
2016	S.C. Senator	Special	Republican	Write-in	N/A	1,246	91.75%	1st	N/A	Won	Hold	
2016	S.C. Senator	Rep. primary	Republican	Rockey Burgess	Republican	6,075	64.95%	1st	+7.95%	Won	N/A	
2016	S.C. Senator	General	Republican	Write-in	N/A	28,064	99.15%	1st	+7.40%	Won	Hold	
2020	S.C. Senator	General	Republican	Jose Villa	Democratic	31,129	72.71%	1st	-26.44%	Won	Hold	

South Carolina House of Representatives
Preceded by Ronnie Townsend	Member of the South Carolina House of Representatives from the 7th district 2006–2016	Succeeded by Jay West
South Carolina Senate
Preceded by William H. O'Dell	Member of the South Carolina Senate from the 4th district 2016–present	Incumbent
