= Greenville Technical College =

College in Greenville, South Carolina, U.S.

- Motto: Clavis ad Futura; Keys to the Future
- Type: Public community college
- Established: 1960
- Parent institution: South Carolina Technical College System
- President: Larry Miller
- Location: Greenville, South Carolina, United States; 34°49′33″N 82°22′23″W
- Website: www.gvltec.edu

Greenville Technical College is a public community college in Greenville, South Carolina. Established in 1960, it began operation in September 1962.

== Campuses ==
Greenville Tech has multiple locations across Greenville County:

- Barton Campus (main location) in Greenville, South Carolina
- Benson Campus in Greer, South Carolina
- Brashier Campus in Simpsonville, South Carolina
- Center for Manufacturing Innovation in Greenville, South Carolina
- Dreisbach/Anderson Student Success Center in Greenville, South Carolina
- McKinney Automotive Center (automotive technology) in Greenville, South Carolina
- Northwest Campus in Berea, South Carolina
- SC Army National Guard Readiness Center at SCTAC
- Truist Culinary & Hospitality Innovation Center in Greenville, South Carolina

== Notable alumni ==
- Todd Kincannon, attorney, politician, activist
- Todd Kohlhepp, American serial killer
- Jesse Hughes (musician), Lead singer of Eagles of Death Metal. Survivor of November 2015 Paris attacks.
