= Polymatheia =

Muse in Greek mythology

Polymatheia (Ancient Greek: Πολυμάθεια, romanized: Polymátheia) in Greek mythology was one of the three Muses recognized at Sicyon, as remarked by Plutarch. Her name literally means "much knowledge, erudition", and Plutarch compares her to Polymnia to whom he ascribes precedence over accumulation and preservation of knowledge.
