= Erskine College–Due West Historic District =

Historic district in South Carolina, United States

- U.S. National Register of Historic Places
- U.S. Historic district
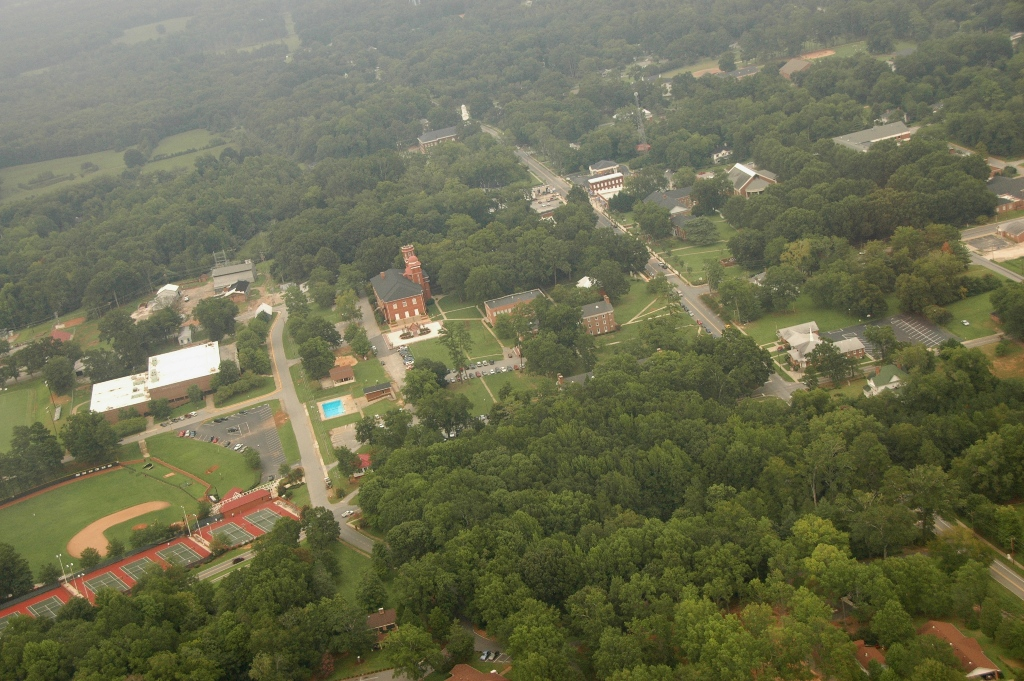
- Aerial view of Due West

- Location within South Carolina Location within the United States
- Location: Due West, South Carolina
- Coordinates: 34°19′45″N 82°23′26″W
- Area: 185 acres (75 ha)
- Built: 1840–1930
- Architectural style: Classical Revival
- NRHP reference No.: 82003825
- Added to NRHP: March 19, 1982

The Erskine College–Due West Historic District, is a historic district in Due West, South Carolina, in the United States. It consists of 88 contributing properties and includes part of the campus of Erskine College as well as private homes, businesses, and other buildings in the town of Due West. On March 19, 1982, it was listed in the National Register of Historic Places

== See also ==
- List of Registered Historic Places in South Carolina
