= Jack of all trades =

Figure of speech

Little Jack of All Trades with suitable representations, an 1814 pamphlet showing representations of various professions

"Jack of all trades, master of none" is a figure of speech used in reference to a person who has dabbled in many skills, rather than gaining expertise by focusing on only one.

In older uses of the phrase, it was meant as a criticism of a person who tries their hand at too many things and perhaps does not do a good job at any of them. The expression eventually became dissociated from its pejorative use. In the 19th century, "a jack of all trades" was often used as a compliment for a person who is good at fixing things and has a good level of broad knowledge. They may be a master of integration: an individual who knows enough from many learned trades and skills to be able to bring the disciplines together in a practical manner. This person is a generalist rather than a specialist. A jack of all trades that is highly skilled in many disciplines is known as a polymath.

The use of the phrase has been much debated online and has been the subject of much misconception. Some, like Gary Martin, claim that the phrase had no negative connotations at its origins. However, Martin fails to show examples of it being used positively before the 1800s. Most records of its early use show that, contrary to the now-popular refutation, the phrase did in fact carry criticism until it was reclaimed as possible praise for a person's versatility.

== History ==
The Lancaster Caleb Quotem, i.e. Jack of all trades. A satirical print from the British Museum, 1872,1012.5012

The phrase "jack of all trades" appears to have first been used in Essays and Characters of a Prison by Geffray Mynshul (Minshull), published in 1618. It was probably based on the author's experience while he was imprisoned for debt in the King's Bench. In a description of the prison, the author gives a satirical profile of a porter:

Now for the most part your Porter is either some broken Citizen, who hath plaid Iack [Jack] of all trades, some Pander, Broker or Hangman, that hath plaid the knaue [knave] with all men, and for the more certainty his Embleme is a red Beard, to which Sacke hath made his nose cousin German.

The "master of none" addition appears to date from the 18th century. The Oxford English Dictionary records "Jack of all Trades; and it would seem, Good at none" as the earliest use of such a variation, in a 1721 edition of the The Boston News-Letter. A 1732 version says that "a jack of all trades is of no trade".

== Usage ==
Today, "jack of all trades, master of none" generally describes a person whose knowledge is superficial because their attention has been dispersed into various directions, rather than specializing on a particular field. When abbreviated as simply "jack of all trades", however, the intended meaning is ambiguous and context-dependent.

In modern usage, the sentence is extended as "a jack of all trades, master of none, but oftentimes better than a master of one". Despite sometimes being described as the "full" or "original" version of the saying, evidence suggests that it is a relatively recent development.

== See also ==
- Amateur
- Competent man
- Generalist (disambiguation)
- Multipotentiality
- Philomath
- Polymath
