= Polymath =

Gifted person with broad knowledge

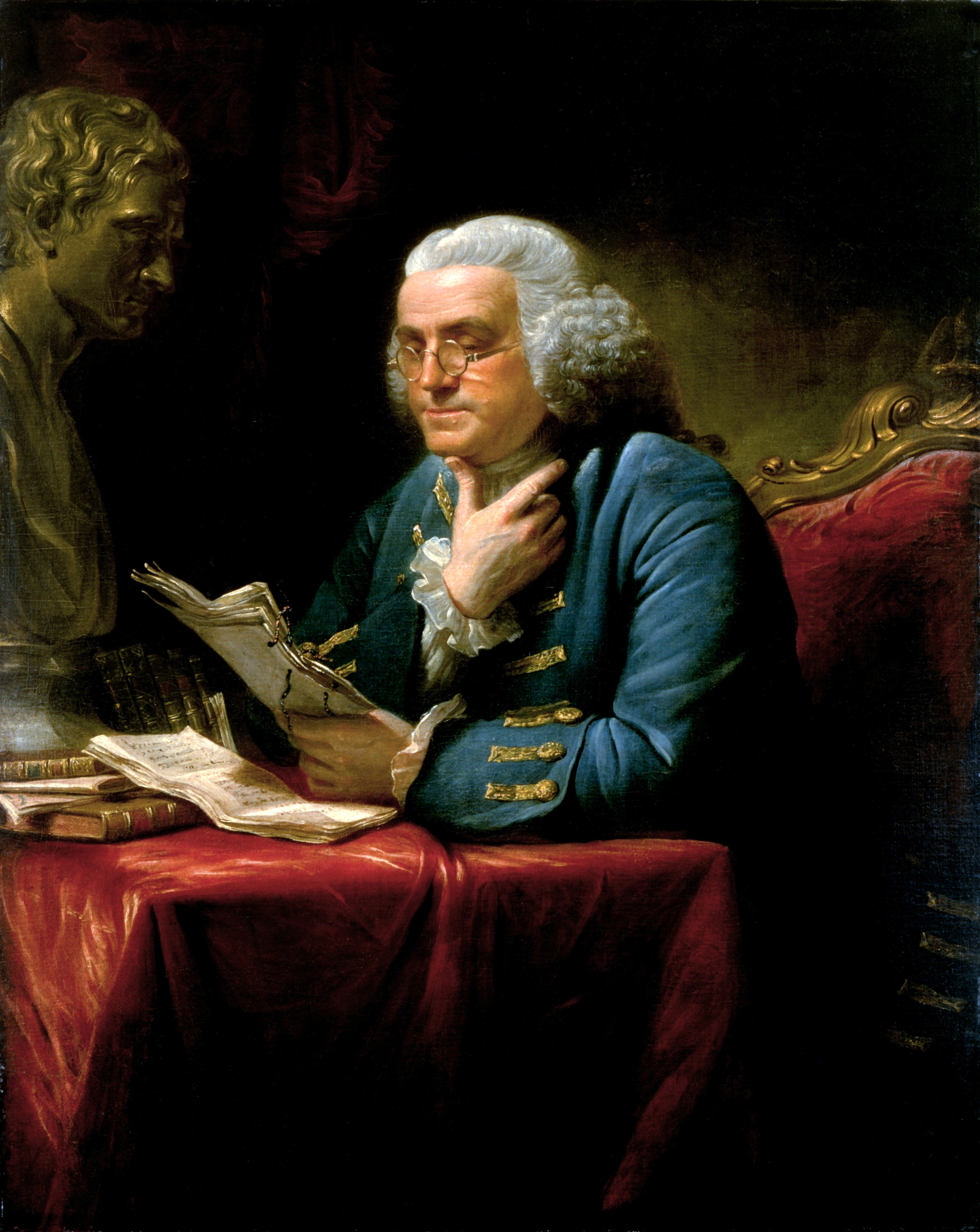
Portrait of Benjamin Franklin by David Martin, 1767. Benjamin Franklin is one of the foremost polymaths in US history. Franklin was a writer, scientist, inventor, statesman, diplomat, printer and political philosopher. He further attained a legacy as one of the Founding Fathers of the United States.

A polymath (Note: (Greek: πολυμαθής, romanized: polymathēs, lit. 'having learned much'; Latin: homo universalis, lit. 'universal human')) or polyhistor (Note: (Greek: πολυΐστωρ, romanized: polyīstor, lit. 'well-learned')) is an individual whose knowledge spans many different subjects, known to draw on complex bodies of knowledge to solve specific problems. Polymaths often prefer a specific context in which to explain their knowledge, but some are gifted at explaining abstractly and creatively.

Embodying a basic tenet of Renaissance humanism that humans are limitless in their capacity for development, the concept led to the notion that people should embrace all knowledge and develop their capacities as fully as possible. This is expressed in the term "Renaissance man", often applied to the gifted people of that age who sought to develop their abilities in all areas of accomplishment: intellectually, artistically, socially, physically, and spiritually.

== Etymology ==
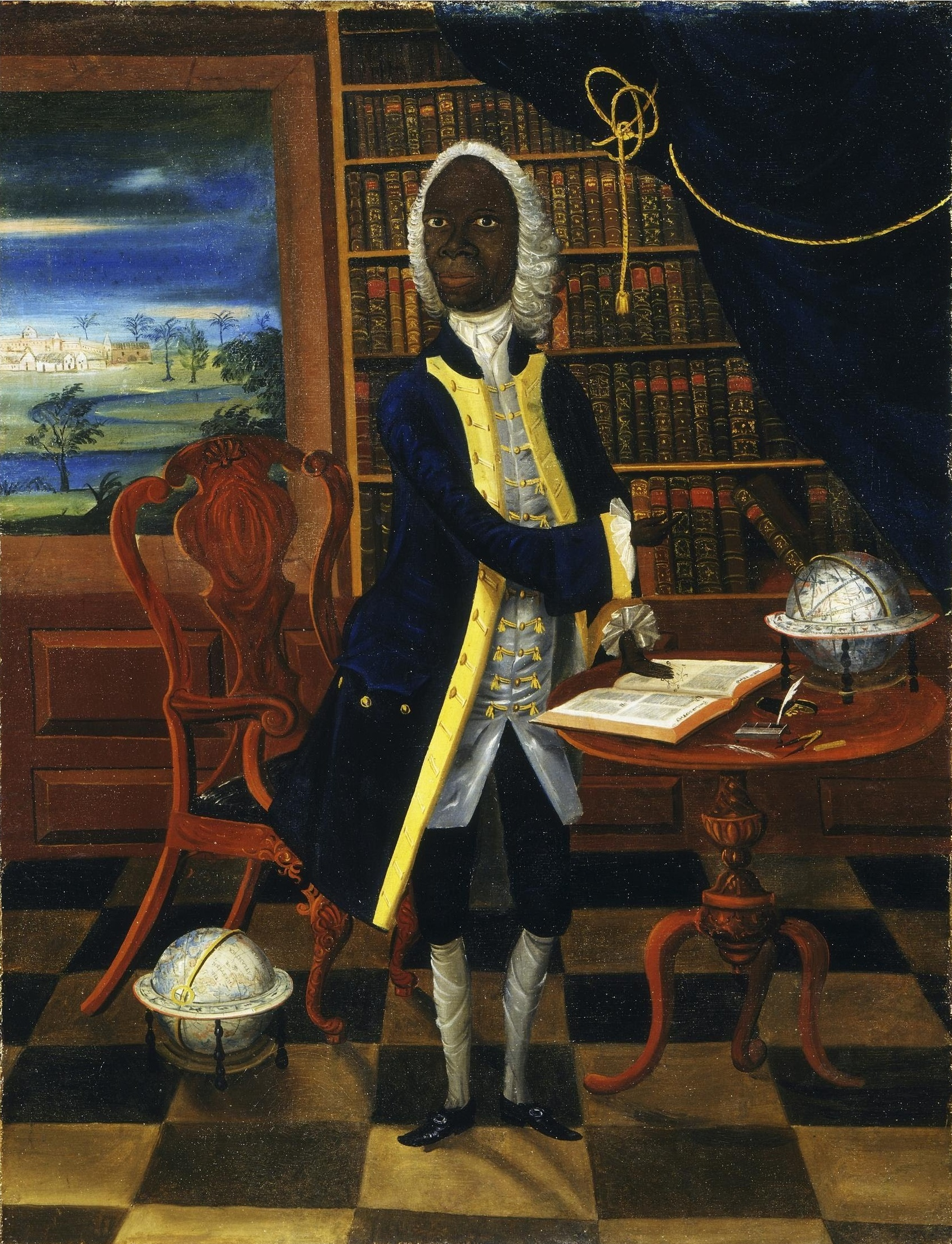
Portrait of Jamaican mathematician, poet and astronomer Francis Williams by William Williams

The word "polymath" derives from the Greek roots poly-, which means "many", "several" or "much", and manthanein, which means "to learn." Plutarch wrote that the Ancient Greek muse Polyhymnia was sometimes known as Polymatheia, describing her as responsible for "that faculty of the soul which inclines to attain and keep knowledge."

In Western Europe, the first work to use the term "polymathy" in its title, De Polymathia tractatio: integri operis de studiis veterum ("A Treatise on Polymathy: The Complete Work on the Studies of the Ancients"), was published in 1603 by Johann von Wowern, a Hamburg philosopher. Von Wowern defined polymathy as "knowledge of various matters, drawn from all kinds of studies ... ranging freely through all the fields of the disciplines, as far as the human mind, with unwearied industry, is able to pursue them". Von Wowern lists erudition, literature, philology, philomathy, and polyhistory as synonyms.

The earliest recorded use of the term in the English language is from 1624, in the second edition of The Anatomy of Melancholy by Robert Burton; the form polymathist is slightly older, first appearing in the Diatribae upon the first part of the late History of Tithes of Richard Montagu in 1621. Use in English of the similar term "polyhistor" dates from the late 16th century.

== Renaissance man ==
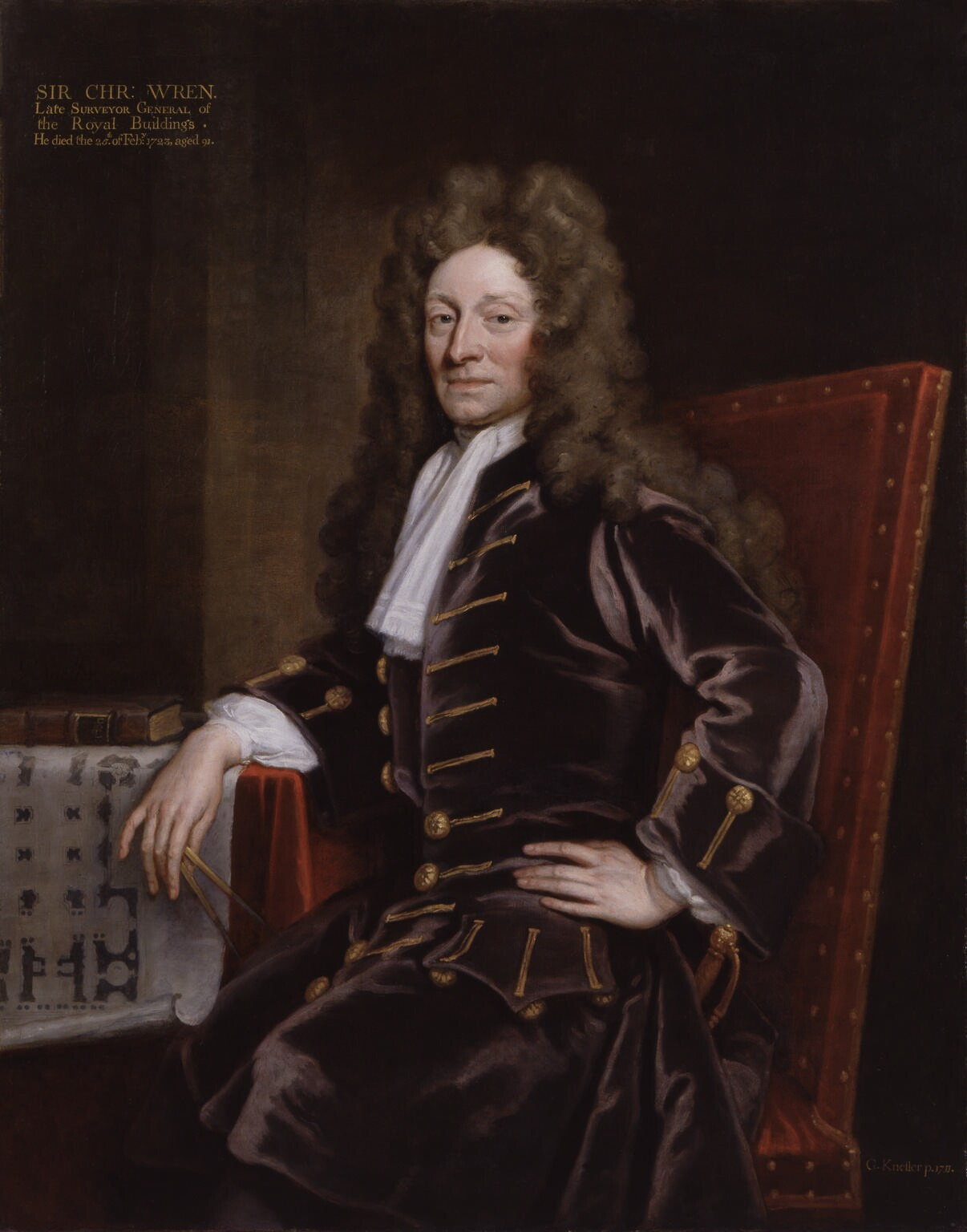
Portrait of Sir Christopher Wren by Godfrey Kneller, 1711. Best known as an architect, Christopher Wren was also an astronomer, mathematician and physicist.

The term "Renaissance man" was first recorded in written English in the early 20th century. The term is used to describe a man as a dynamic being who creates and recreates himself during his life. The concept arose with the rise of capitalism. It is used to refer to great polymaths like those of the Renaissance. Leonardo da Vinci has often been described as the archetype of the Renaissance man, a man of "unquenchable curiosity" and "feverishly inventive imagination". Many notable polymaths (Note: Though numerous figures in history could be considered to be polymaths, they are not listed here, as they are not only too numerous to list, but also as the definition of any one figure as a polymath is disputable, due to the term's loosely defined nature, there being no given set of characteristics outside of a person having a wide range of learning across a number of different disciplines; many also did not identify as polymaths, the term having only come into existence in the early 17th century.) lived during the Renaissance period, a cultural movement that spanned roughly the 14th through to the 17th century that began in Italy in the Late Middle Ages and later spread to the rest of Europe. These polymaths had a rounded approach to education that reflected the ideals of the humanists of the time. A gentleman or courtier of that era was expected to speak several languages, play a musical instrument, write poetry, and so on; thus fulfilling the Renaissance ideal.

The idea of a universal education was essential to achieving polymath ability, hence the word "university" was used to describe a seat of learning. However, the original Latin word universitas refers in general to "a number of persons associated into one body, a society, company, community, guild, corporation, etc". At this time, universities did not specialize in specific areas, but rather trained students in a broad array of science, philosophy, and theology. This universal education gave them a grounding from which they could continue into apprenticeship toward becoming a master of a specific field.

When someone is called a "Renaissance man" today, it is meant that rather than simply having broad interests or superficial knowledge in several fields, the individual possesses a more profound knowledge and a proficiency, or even an expertise, in at least some of those fields. Some dictionaries use the term "Renaissance man" to describe someone with many interests or talents, while others give a meaning restricted to the Renaissance and more closely related to Renaissance ideals.

== In academia ==
=== Robert Root-Bernstein and colleagues ===
Robert Root-Bernstein is considered the principal responsible for rekindling interest in polymathy in the scientific community. His works emphasize the contrast between the polymath and two other types: the specialist and the dilettante. The specialist demonstrates depth but lacks breadth of knowledge. The dilettante demonstrates superficial breadth but tends to acquire skills merely "for their own sake without regard to understanding the broader applications or implications and without integrating it". Conversely, the polymath is a person with a level of expertise that is able to "put a significant amount of time and effort into their avocations and find ways to use their multiple interests to inform their vocations".

A key point in the work of Root-Bernstein and colleagues is the argument in favor of the universality of the creative process. That is, although creative products, such as a painting, a mathematical model or a poem, can be domain-specific, at the level of the creative process, the mental tools that lead to the generation of creative ideas are the same, be it in the arts or science. These mental tools are sometimes called intuitive tools of thinking. It is therefore not surprising that many of the most innovative scientists have serious hobbies or interests in artistic activities, and that some of the most innovative artists have an interest or hobbies in the sciences.

Root-Bernstein and colleagues' research is an important counterpoint to the claim by some psychologists that creativity is a domain-specific phenomenon. Through their research, Root-Bernstein and colleagues conclude that there are certain comprehensive thinking skills and tools that cross the barrier of different domains and can foster creative thinking: "[creativity researchers] who discuss integrating ideas from diverse fields as the basis of creative giftedness ask not 'who is creative?' but 'what is the basis of creative thinking?' From the polymathy perspective, giftedness is the ability to combine disparate (or even apparently contradictory) ideas, sets of problems, skills, talents, and knowledge in novel and useful ways. Polymathy is therefore the main source of any individual's creative potential". In "Life Stages of Creativity", Robert and Michèle Root-Bernstein suggest six typologies of creative life stages. These typologies are based on real creative production records first published by Root-Bernstein, Bernstein, and Garnier (1993).

- Type 1 represents people who specialize in developing one major talent early in life (e.g., prodigies) and successfully exploit that talent exclusively for the rest of their lives.
- Type 2 individuals explore a range of different creative activities (e.g., through worldplay or a variety of hobbies) and then settle on exploiting one of these for the rest of their lives.
- Type 3 people are polymathic from the outset and manage to juggle multiple careers simultaneously so that their creativity pattern is constantly varied.
- Type 4 creators are recognized early for one major talent (e.g., math or music) but go on to explore additional creative outlets, diversifying their productivity with age.
- Type 5 creators devote themselves serially to one creative field after another.
- Type 6 people develop diversified creative skills early and then, like Type 5 individuals, explore these serially, one at a time.

Finally, his studies suggest that understanding polymathy and learning from polymathic exemplars can help structure a new model of education that better promotes creativity and innovation: "we must focus education on principles, methods, and skills that will serve them [students] in learning and creating across many disciplines, multiple careers, and succeeding life stages".

=== Peter Burke ===
Peter Burke, professor emeritus of Cultural History and Fellow of Emmanuel College at Cambridge, discussed the theme of polymathy in some of his works. He has presented a comprehensive historical overview of the ascension and decline of the polymath as, what he calls, an "intellectual species".

He observes that in ancient and medieval times, scholars did not have to specialize. However, from the 17th century on, the rapid rise of new knowledge in the Western world—both from the systematic investigation of the natural world and from the flow of information coming from other parts of the world—was making it increasingly difficult for individual scholars to master as many disciplines as before. Thus, an intellectual retreat of the polymath species occurred: "from knowledge in every [academic] field to knowledge in several fields, and from making original contributions in many fields to a more passive consumption of what has been contributed by others".

Given this change in the intellectual climate, it has since then been more common to find "passive polymaths", who consume knowledge in various domains but make their reputation in one single discipline, than "proper polymaths", who—through a feat of "intellectual heroism"—manage to make serious contributions to several disciplines. However, Burke warns that in the age of specialization, polymathic people are more necessary than ever, both for synthesis—to paint the big picture—and for analysis. He says: "It takes a polymath to 'mind the gap' and draw attention to the knowledges that may otherwise disappear into the spaces between disciplines, as they are currently defined and organized"

=== Bharath Sriraman ===
Bharath Sriraman, of the University of Montana, also investigated the role of polymathy in education. He poses that an ideal education should nurture talent in the classroom and enable individuals to pursue multiple fields of research and appreciate both the aesthetic and structural/scientific connections between mathematics, arts and the sciences.

In 2009, Sriraman published a paper reporting a 3-year study with 120 pre-service mathematics teachers and derived several implications for mathematics pre-service education as well as interdisciplinary education. He utilized a hermeneutic-phenomenological approach to recreate the emotions, voices and struggles of students as they tried to unravel Russell's paradox presented in its linguistic form. They found that those more engaged in solving the paradox also displayed more polymathic thinking traits. He concludes by suggesting that fostering polymathy in the classroom may help students change beliefs, discover structures and open new avenues for interdisciplinary pedagogy.

=== Kaufman, Beghetto and colleagues ===
James C. Kaufman, from the Neag School of Education at the University of Connecticut, and Ronald A. Beghetto, from the same university, investigated the possibility that everyone could have the potential for polymathy as well as the issue of the domain-generality or domain-specificity of creativity.

Based on their earlier four-c model of creativity, Beghetto and Kaufman proposed a typology of polymathy, ranging from the ubiquitous mini-c polymathy to the eminent but rare Big-C polymathy, as well as a model with some requirements for a person (polymath or not) to be able to reach the highest levels of creative accomplishment. They account for three general requirements—intelligence, motivation to be creative, and an environment that allows creative expression—that are needed for any attempt at creativity to succeed. Then, depending on the domain of choice, more specific abilities will be required. The more that one's abilities and interests match the requirements of a domain, the better. While some will develop their specific skills and motivations for specific domains, polymathic people will display intrinsic motivation (and the ability) to pursue a variety of subject matters across different domains.

Regarding the interplay of polymathy and education, they suggest that rather than asking whether every student has multicreative potential, educators might more actively nurture the multicreative potential of their students. As an example, the authors cite that teachers should encourage students to make connections across disciplines, use different forms of media to express their reasoning/understanding (e.g., drawings, movies, and other forms of visual media).

=== Waqas Ahmed ===
In his 2018 book The Polymath, British author Waqas Ahmed defines polymaths as those who have made significant contributions to at least three different fields. Rather than seeing polymaths as exceptionally gifted, he argues that every human being has the potential to become one: that people naturally have multiple interests and talents. He contrasts this polymathic nature against what he calls "the cult of specialisation". For example, education systems stifle this nature by forcing learners to specialise in narrow topics. The book argues that specialisation encouraged by the production lines of the Industrial Revolution is counter-productive both to the individual and wider society. It suggests that the complex problems of the 21st century need the versatility, creativity, and broad perspectives characteristic of polymaths.

For individuals, Ahmed says, specialisation is dehumanising and stifles their full range of expression whereas polymathy "is a powerful means to social and intellectual emancipation" which enables a more fulfilling life. In terms of social progress, he argues that answers to specific problems often come from combining knowledge and skills from multiple areas, and that many important problems are multi-dimensional in nature and cannot be fully understood through one specialism. Rather than interpreting polymathy as a mix of occupations or of intellectual interests, Ahmed urges a breaking of the "thinker"/"doer" dichotomy and the art/science dichotomy. He argues that an orientation towards action and towards thinking support each other, and that human beings flourish by pursuing a diversity of experiences as well as a diversity of knowledge. He observes that successful people in many fields have cited hobbies and other "peripheral" activities as supplying skills or insights that helped them succeed.

Ahmed examines evidence suggesting that developing multiple talents and perspectives is helpful for success in a highly specialised field. He cites a study of Nobel Prize-winning scientists which found them 25 times more likely to sing, dance, or act than average scientists. Another study found that children scored higher in IQ tests after having drum lessons, and he uses such research to argue that diversity of domains can enhance a person's general intelligence.

Ahmed cites many historical claims for the advantages of polymathy. Some of these are about general intellectual abilities that polymaths apply across multiple domains. For example, Aristotle wrote that full understanding of a topic requires, in addition to subject knowledge, a general critical thinking ability that can assess how that knowledge was arrived at. Another advantage of a polymathic mindset is in the application of multiple approaches to understanding a single issue. Ahmed cites biologist E. O. Wilson's view that reality is approached not by a single academic discipline but via a consilience between them. One argument for studying multiple approaches is that it leads to open-mindedness. Within any one perspective, a question may seem to have a straightforward, settled answer. Someone aware of different, contrasting answers will be more open-minded and aware of the limitations of their own knowledge. The importance of recognising these limitations is a theme that Ahmed finds in many thinkers, including Confucius, Ali ibn Abi Talib, and Nicolas of Cusa. He calls it "the essential mark of the polymath." A further argument for multiple approaches is that a polymath does not see diverse approaches as diverse, because they see connections where other people see differences. For example da Vinci advanced multiple fields by applying mathematical principles to each.

A similar term is homo universalis (Latin) and uomo universale (Italian), which translate to 'universal man'.

== See also ==
- Amateur
- Competent man
- Creative class
- Genius
- Interdisciplinarity
- Jack of all trades, master of none
- List of multi-instrumentalists
- List of multi-sport athletes
- Multipotentiality
- Opsimath
- Philomath
- Polyglotism
- Polygraph (author)
- Polymatheia – a muse of knowledge in Greek mythology
