= Erskine College =

Christian college in Due West, South Carolina, US

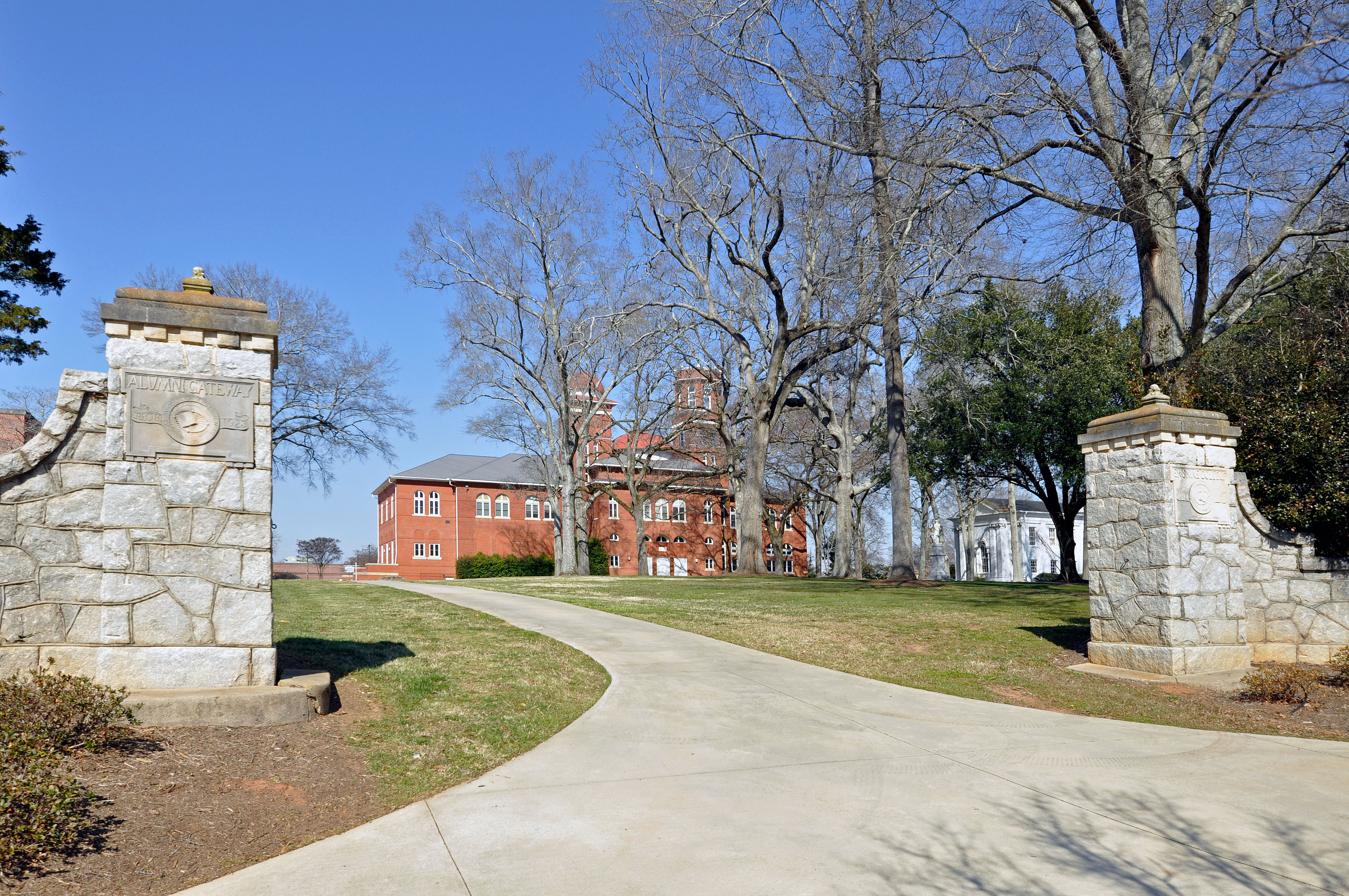
- Main Building past the front gate
- Motto: Scienta cum Moribus Conjuncta
- Motto in English: Knowledge joined with Morals
- Type: Private college
- Established: 1839; 187 years ago
- Religious affiliation: Associate Reformed Presbyterian Church
- Endowment: $38.5 million
- President: Steven Adamson
- Faculty: 33 full-time, 50 part-time (fall 2023)
- Students: 984 (Fall 2023)
- Undergraduates: 854 (Fall 2023)
- Postgraduates: 130 (Fall 2023)
- Location: Due West, South Carolina, US; 34°19′54″N 82°23′25″W
- Campus: Rural
- Colors: Garnet and gold
- Nickname: Flying Fleet
- Sporting affiliations: NCAA Division II – Carolinas
- Website: erskine.edu

Erskine College is a private Christian college in Due West, South Carolina, United States. It is the oldest church-related college in the state.

Erskine offers undergraduate liberal arts programs, as well as graduate and seminary degrees. The college was founded in 1836 by the Associate Reformed Presbyterian Church. Its sports teams compete in NCAA Division II as a member of Conference Carolinas.

The institution was named for Ebenezer Erskine, a pastor and one of the founders of one of the antecedent bodies of the Associate Reformed Presbyterian Church. Ebenezer Erskine had led a group of separatists from the Church of Scotland to found an Associate Presbytery.

== History ==
Erskine’s history began with the opening of a school in Due West, South Carolina, on February 1, 1836. The previous year, the Associate Reformed Presbyterian Church had authorized the school, appointed John S. Pressly as principal, and directed that an application be made for incorporation. The school provided a classical education designed for young men pursuing further study, including those preparing for the ministry.

In November 1836, the ARP Synod organized a theological department alongside the school’s existing classical instruction and, by 1837, was making plans to expand the school into an institution “at which a thorough course of education, both literary and theological, can be obtained" (Synod minutes, 1837, p. 15; Synod minutes, October 8, 1838, p. 3). South Carolina incorporated the institution as Clark and Erskine Seminary in 1837.

Synod’s resolution to expand the institution took shape in 1839 when the existing Literary Department established a complete four-year curriculum. At that time, Synod appointed Ebenezer Erskine Pressly as the institution’s first president and enlarged the faculty to support the expanded course of study.

Erskine held its first graduation in 1842. By that year, the name Erskine College appeared in institutional publications and public notices. In 1850, South Carolina granted a charter to “The Trustees of Erskine College,” providing the established college with a fuller corporate structure.

During the mid-nineteenth century, the College and Seminary developed distinct administrative arrangements. The Seminary became separately organized in the late 1850s and received its own incorporation in 1863. Both continued the educational work that had developed from the original school at Due West.

Erskine began to admit women in 1894 and officially became coeducational in 1899. In 1927, it merged with Due West Female College, founded in 1859. In 1929, Bryson College closed and merged with Erskine College.

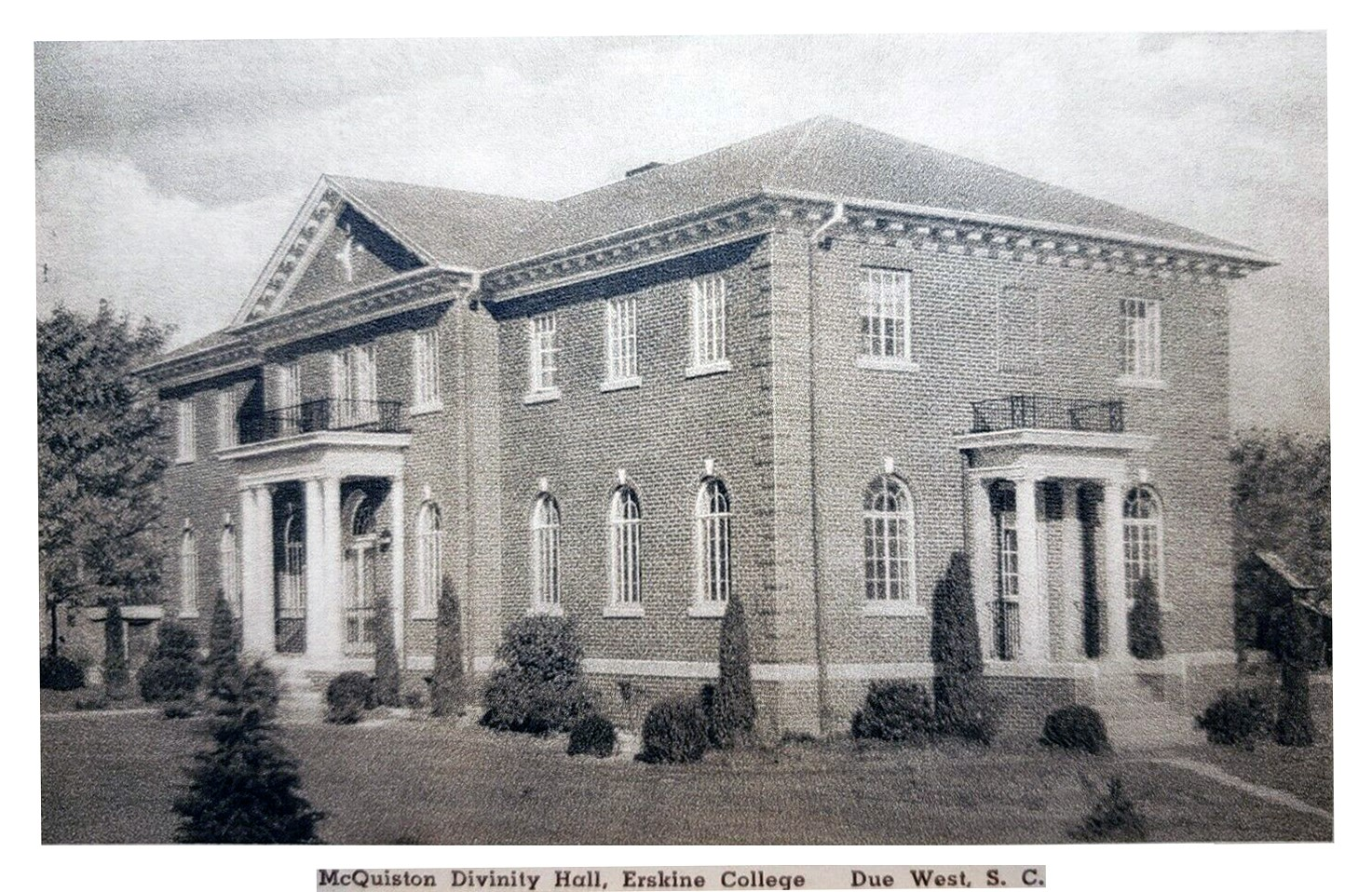
McQuiston Divinity Hall c. 1940

A planned merger of the college, the seminary, and the Due West Woman's College paved the way for accreditation by the Southern Association of Colleges in 1925. By 1927 the three schools had merged into one institution called Erskine College, with the seminary serving as its graduate theological school.

During World War II Erskine served as a cadet training school for the United States Army Air Corps. A substantial enrollment effort in the late 1950s brought Erskine's undergraduate enrollment to over 700 students throughout the 1960s and into the 1970s. In the 2022–23 school year, enrollment was at an all-time high of 830 undergraduate and 137 graduate seminary students.

On March 11, 2014, a website article on Outsports detailed the coming out of two gay male players on the college's volleyball team. On February 27, 2015, Erskine College released a statement that students are expected to "follow the teachings of scripture concerning matters of human sexuality."

=== Accreditation issues ===
Erskine was placed on "warning" status by its accreditor, the Southern Association of Colleges and Schools, following its decennial accreditation review in December 2013. The college's status was reviewed in December 2014, and the sanction was then escalated to "Probation" status, due to continued failure to comply with accreditation standards related to fiscal stability and institutional effectiveness in student learning outcomes. SACSCOC removed all accreditation sanctions and reaffirmed Erskine's regional accreditation in December 2015.

In 2023, Erskine was once again placed on "warning" status following review. SACS cited financial issues and board control as determining factors. Steve Adamson, president of Erskine, said he fully expected "to have the warning lifted in December 2023 and the institution’s reaffirmation granted." However, in December 2023, Erskine was continued on warning status. In January 2025, Erskine College's accreditation was reaffirmed with all sanctions removed and no monitoring required. The college has its next SACSCOC accreditation scheduled for 2032.

=== Charter schools ===
In 2017, Erskine College began sponsoring charter schools in South Carolina through the Charter Institute at Erskine. The president of Erskine College serves as the chairman of the institute, while Cameron Runyan serves as superintendent and CEO. The Charter Institute attracted media attention in 2024, when it formed Teach Right USA, a nonprofit which shares leadership with the institute and sought to found charter schools sponsored by the institute. Through the nonprofit, leaders of the institute explored starting charter schools in Tennessee. State legislators requested information to determine of state funds or hours were used in the endeavor.

In 2021, Erskine College loaned one million dollars to a for-profit charter school management organization, which defaulted on their loan, ultimately only repaying $35,000. The transaction was not made public until 2024, when Erskine filed a lawsuit seeking to recover the full amount.

=== Presidents ===
Presidential history
1.	E.E. Pressly	1839–1847
2.	R.C. Grier	1847–1859
3.	E.L. Patton	1859–1861
	R.C. Grier (Note: Second term, Erskine College does not count Grier twice)	1865–1871
4.	W.M. Grier	1871–1899
5.	F.Y. Pressly	1899–1907
6.	J.S. Moffatt	1907–1921
7.	R.C. Grier	1921–1954
8.	J.M. Lesesne	1954–1966
9.	Joseph Wightman	1966–1973
10.	M. Stanyarne Bell	1973–1981
11.	William Bruce Ezell Jr.	1981–1989
12.	James W. Strobel	1990–1998
13.	John L. Carson	1998–2005
	Luder Whitlock (Note: Interim president)	2005–2006
14.	Randall T. Ruble	2006–2010
15.	David Norman	2010–2013
	N. Bradley Christie (Note: Acting president)	2013–2014
16.	Paul Kooistra	2014–2016
17.	Robert Gustafson (Note: Gustafson served for seven months as interim president, before being officially named to the role in 2017)	2016–2021
	Tom Hellams (Note: Hellams served as interim president from July 2021 through January 2022,)	2021–2022
18.	Steve Adamson	2022–

== Academics ==
Academic rankings

Regional
- U.S. News & World Report: 43 (tie) of 90

National
- Washington Monthly: 437 of 438

Erskine College offers Bachelor of Arts and Bachelor of Science degrees. Minors are offered in several fields of study. A Christian Ministry concentration is offered within the Bible and Religion major and special minors are offered, such as Secondary Education, Business Analytics, Healthcare Administration and Information Technology. The college also offers pre-professional programs in medicine, law, pharmacy, and dentistry. The student to faculty ratio is 15:1.

Erskine is accredited by the Southern Association of Colleges and Schools.

== Athletics ==
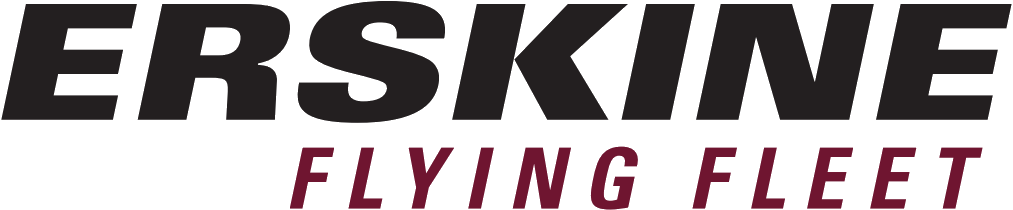
Flying Fleet wordmark

The Erskine College's athletics teams, nicknamed the "Flying Fleet" participate in NCAA Division II sports as a member of Conference Carolinas.

Men's sports include baseball, basketball, cross country, football, golf, soccer, track and field, and volleyball; while women's sports include basketball, beach volleyball, cheerleading, cross country, dance, golf, lacrosse, soccer, softball, tennis, track and field, and volleyball. Co-educational sports include bass fishing, e-sports, and rodeo.

=== Flying Fleet football ===
In 1896, Erskine College began its first American football team. They had successful seasons between 1917 and 1921. During those seasons they had wins against Wofford, Presbyterian, South Carolina, Clemson, and the Citadel. Notably, it was during a game against Furman University in 1929 that Erskine was first referred to as "The Flying Fleet", a nickname given to them by a Greenville reporter who was impressed by their passing performance. On October 18, 1948, they defeated Florida State 14–6. The Flying Fleet ended their football program in 1951.

In 2018, Erskine College announced the return of the football program for the 2020 season competing as an Independent in NCAA Division II. In 2021, The Flying Fleet played its first football game in 70 years.

== Notable people ==
=== Alumni ===
Members of the class of 2007

- Susan Audé – WIS-TV news anchor
- Erskine Caldwell – author (attended, but did not graduate)
- Rex L. Carter – lawyer and politician
- Beth Couture – head coach of the Butler Bulldogs women's basketball team
- Lawrence Cowan – Arizona territorial, legislator, judge, lawyer, and businessman
- Tom Ervin – member of the South Carolina House of Representatives
- Alphonza Gadsden – bishop of the Reformed Episcopal Church
- Thomas S. Gettys – U.S. Congressman from South Carolina
- Charles Haldeman – novelist
- Joseph T. Johnson – U.S. Representative from South Carolina and U.S. district judge
- Ira B. Jones – former South Carolina Supreme Court Chief Justice and gubernatorial candidate
- Todd Kincannon – attorney, politician and activist
- Thomas G. Long – Bandy Professor of Preaching at Candler School of Theology at Emory University
- Henry McMaster – governor of South Carolina, honorary doctorate recipient 2023
- Benjamin Meek Miller – governor of Alabama, 1931–1935
- William Bell Montgomery – founder of Southern Farm Gazette (now known as the Progressive Farmer) and Mississippi State University
- Eric Moody – professional baseball player
- Joseph Rodney Moss – former Associate Justice and Chief Justice on the South Carolina Supreme Court
- Champ Osteen – professional baseball player
- Lemuel P. Padgett – U.S. Congressman from Tennessee
- Garth Pollonais – professional soccer player
- Buck Pressly – professional baseball player
- Eleanor C. Pressly – aeronautical engineer at Goddard Space Flight Center
- Charles Bryson Simonton – U.S. Congressman from Tennessee
- W. Jasper Talbert – U.S. Congressman
- Eugene Van Taylor – professional soccer player
- Tom Verlaine – lead singer/guitarist of proto-punk rock band Television (attended, but did not graduate)
- Jay West – politician
- Herbert L. Wilkerson – United States Marine Corps major general
- Li Zhengming – Chinese engineer and professor

== See also ==
- Due West Female College
- Euphemian Literary Society
- List of colleges and universities in South Carolina
- Philomathean Literary Society (Erskine College)
