= Information technology generalist =

Computing discipline

An information technology (IT) generalist is a technology professional proficient in many facets of information technology but without any specific specialty. Furthermore, an IT generalist is generally considered to possess general business knowledge and soft skills, allowing them to be adaptable in a wide array of work environments. The IT Generalist is often able to fulfill many different roles within a company depending on specific technology needs. In a small business environment, budgets often assign many different aspects of technology to a single individual, especially since a small business typically requires someone proficient in desktop support, web page design, databases, phone systems, and server administration. The role of the IT Generalist within a larger company, however, often becomes more of a project leader or integrations specialist due to a project team consisting of a varying degree of IT specialists and interfacing with end-users requiring soft-skills.

== Industry role ==
The information technology industry encompasses a multitude of disparate technologies, each playing a crucial role in the overall technology landscape. As technology practices change new methods, techniques, and tools become available that often require human expertise to implement and maintain technology systems. The human expertise required to manage these new systems has given rise to what is defined as an IT specialist—someone with an expert level of competency and knowledge on a particular piece of technology. In comparison, the IT Generalist does not possess the expert knowledge to implement an advanced system but instead possesses the knowledge and experience to ensure all of the disparate technologies can function properly together.

The generalist has become an increasingly valuable asset to a company, especially when it comes to the rapidly changing field of technology. In many cases, companies are more apt to demand hiring and retaining employees that are multifunctional, especially those that have analytical abilities such as critical reasoning and statistical analysis.

== Market trends ==
Market trends tend to be moving away from the hiring of IT specialists and instead individuals who possess a more broad technical base with additional soft skills such as enthusiasm, passion, and energy. In even some cases, IT specialists with years of experience may be passed over for more malleable hires because as technology changes, innovation may be stifled by specialists not being able to adjust to new procedures and processes in the market. The attributes associated with an IT generalist have been defined in other occupational series as well. A study conducted over five years with more than 250 political science specialists recorded their political predictions alongside a large sample of generalists' predictions to determine whether the specialists' expert knowledge made them more effective in forecasting. The study discovered that those with limited political science exposure were more accurate in their predictions—most likely as a result of their more varied and unfocused exposure to political science as compared to those of the specialists.

== Arguments for and against ==
The debate between the IT generalist and specialist has been going on for years as companies are trying to determine how to best utilize their IT department skills and assets. Up until recently the general consensus of the market has been the hiring of IT specialists due to the implementation of advanced technologies such as cloud computing, next-generation mobile application development, and the virtualization of technology infrastructure. It has been found, however, that the hiring of specialists has led to the rise of silos of talent within a company, leading to difficulty implementing new business processes and taking advantage of interdepartmental collaboration. This compartmentalization of knowledge and skills has led to companies shifting focus to the hiring and implementing of IT Generalists for the purposes of implementing a more mobile, adaptable, and diverse technology department.

According to multiple studies in 2010, companies that were surveyed noted their goal was to reduce the amount of specialists they hire and instead hire “versatilists.” These versatilists are synonymous with IT Generalists because they have an overall general sense of technology as well as business knowledge while also possessing “soft skills” that are considered lacking in technology-minded individuals focused on specific technology skill-sets.
