= Generalist Genes hypothesis =

The Generalist Genes hypothesis of learning abilities and disabilities was originally coined in an article by Plomin & Kovas (2005).

The Generalist Genes hypothesis suggests that most genes associated with common learning disabilities and abilities are generalist in three ways.

- Firstly, the same genes that influence common learning abilities (e.g., high reading aptitude) are also responsible for common learning disabilities (e.g., reading disability): they are strongly genetically correlated.
- Secondly, many of the genes associated with one aspect of a learning disability (e.g., vocabulary problems) also influence other aspects of this learning disability (e.g., grammar problems).
- Thirdly, genes that influence one learning disability (e.g., reading disability) are largely the same as those that influence other learning disabilities (e.g., mathematics disability).

The Generalist Genes hypothesis has important implications for education, cognitive sciences and molecular genetics.
