= Philomath =

Lover of learning

A philomath (/ˈfɪləmæθ/) is a lover of learning and studying.

The term is from Greek philos (φίλος; "beloved", "loving", as in philosophy or philanthropy) and manthanein, math- (μανθάνειν, μαθ-; "to learn", as in polymath).

Philomathy is similar to, but distinguished from, philosophy in that -soph, the latter suffix, specifies "wisdom" or "knowledge", rather than the process of acquisition thereof. Philomath is not synonymous with polymath, as a polymath is someone who possesses great and detailed knowledge and facts from a variety of disciplines, while a philomath is someone who greatly enjoys learning and studying.

== Overview ==
The shift in meaning for mathema is likely a result of the rapid categorization during the time of Plato and Aristotle of their mathemata in terms of education: arithmetic, geometry, astronomy, and music (the quadrivium), which the Greeks found to create a "natural grouping" of mathematical (in the modern usage; "doctrina mathematica" in the ancient usage) precepts.

In a philosophical dialogue, King James penned the character Philomathes to debate on arguments of whether the ancient religious concepts of witchcraft should be punished in a politically fueled Christian society. The arguments King James poses through the character Epistemon are based on concepts of theological reasoning regarding society's belief, as his opponent, Philomathes, takes a philosophical stance on society's legal aspects but seeks to obtain the knowledge of Epistemon. This philosophical approach signified a philomath seeking to obtain greater knowledge through epistemology. The dialogue was used by King James to educate society on various concepts including the history and etymology of the subjects debated.

== Pantomath ==
A pantomath is a person who wants to know or knows everything. The word itself is not to be found in common online English dictionaries, the OED, dictionaries of obscure words, or dictionaries of neologisms. A pantomath (pantomathēs, παντομαθής, meaning "having learnt all", from the Greek roots παντ- "all", "every" and the root μαθ-, meaning "learning", "understanding") is a person whose astonishingly wide interests and knowledge span the entire range of the arts and sciences.

Pantomath is typically used to convey the sense that a great individual has achieved a pinnacle of learning, that an "automath" has taken autodidacticism to an endpoint. As an example, the obscure and rare term seems to have been applied to those with an astonishingly wide knowledge and interests by these two authors from different eras: Jonathan Miller has been called a pantomath, as has Rupert Hart-Davis.

== See also ==
- Benjamin Franklin, who used this pen name
- Philomath, Oregon
- Philomathean Literary Society (Erskine College)
- Philomathean Society, a literary society at the University of Pennsylvania
- Philomathean Society (New York University)
- Philomaths, Polish secret student organization that existed, 1817–1823, at the Imperial University of Vilnius
