= Ebenezer Erskine Pressly =

American pastor and academic

Ebenezer Erskine Pressly (December 23, 1808 – 1860) was the first president of Erskine Theological Seminary and Erskine College, beginning his service in 1838.

== Early life and family ==
Pressly was born on December 23, 1808, in the lower part of Abbeville District, South Carolina. He was the youngest son of William and Elizabeth Hearst Pressly. He lived in Cedar Springs, South Carolina. In 1824, Pressly entered Miami University at Oxford, Ohio, at the age of 16; he graduated in 1826. He went on to study theology under John T. Pressly.

Pressly was installed as pastor of the Generostee and Due West Associate Reformed Presbyterian Church (A.R.P.) congregations on August 7, 1830. He gave up the position at Generostee in 1838, but continued to serve as pastor of the Due West church for another 30 years, during his tenure as president of the college.

In 1831, Pressly was married to Elizabeth Agnew, daughter of Samuel and Malinda Agnew of Due West, South Carolina. Fourteen children were born to them, all of these died in infancy except three daughters and one son, William Laurens Pressly, President of Erskine Seminary. On June 20, 1853, Ebenezer Pressly's wife died. He later married Mary A. Taylor of Laurens County, South Carolina, in 1854. They had two children from this marriage, both dying in infancy.

== Erskine Theological Seminary ==
In 1838, Pressly became a professor at Erskine Theological Seminary and the president of Erskine College. In "The Centennial History of the Associate Reformed Presbyterian Church, 1803-1903" sketch of his life, Pressly is called "the father of Erskine College.

== Death ==
In 1860, Pressly was accidentally killed when he was thrown from his buggy while on his way to fill an appointment at Little Mountain. He is buried in the Associate Reformed Presbyterian Church cemetery in Due West.

== Bibliography ==
- (1903). The Centennial History of the Associate Reformed Presbyterian Church, 1803-1903. Charleston: Walker, Evans, and Cogswell.
- Wilson, Joseph M. (1859). The Presbyterian historical almanac, and annual remembrancer of the church for 1858-1859.
