= Hutchinson letters affair =

1773 publication that increased tension between Massachusetts and the British

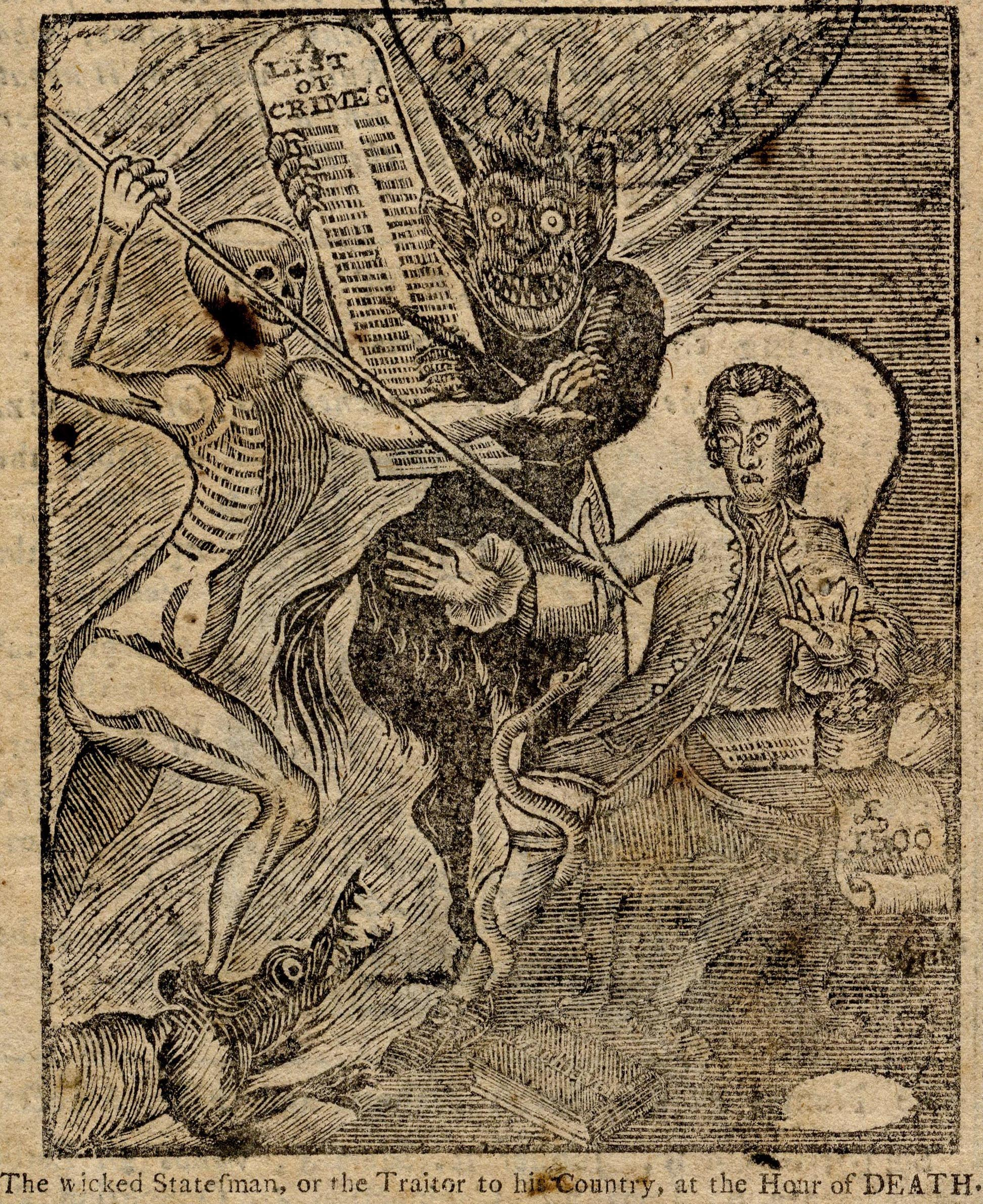
Political cartoon from 1774 by Paul Revere, depicting Death attacking Governor Thomas Hutchinson.

The Hutchinson letters affair was an incident that increased tensions between the colonists of the Province of Massachusetts Bay and the British government prior to the American Revolution.

In June 1773, letters written several years earlier by Thomas Hutchinson and Andrew Oliver, who were governor and lieutenant governor of the province at the time of their publication, were published in a Boston newspaper. The content of the letters was propagandistically claimed by Massachusetts radical politicians to call for the abridgement of colonial rights, and a duel was fought in England over the matter.

The affair served to inflame tensions in Massachusetts, where the implementation of the 1773 Tea Act was met with resistance that culminated in the Boston Tea Party in December 1773. The response of the British government to the publication of the letters served to turn Benjamin Franklin, one of the principal figures in the affair, into a committed Patriot.

== Background ==
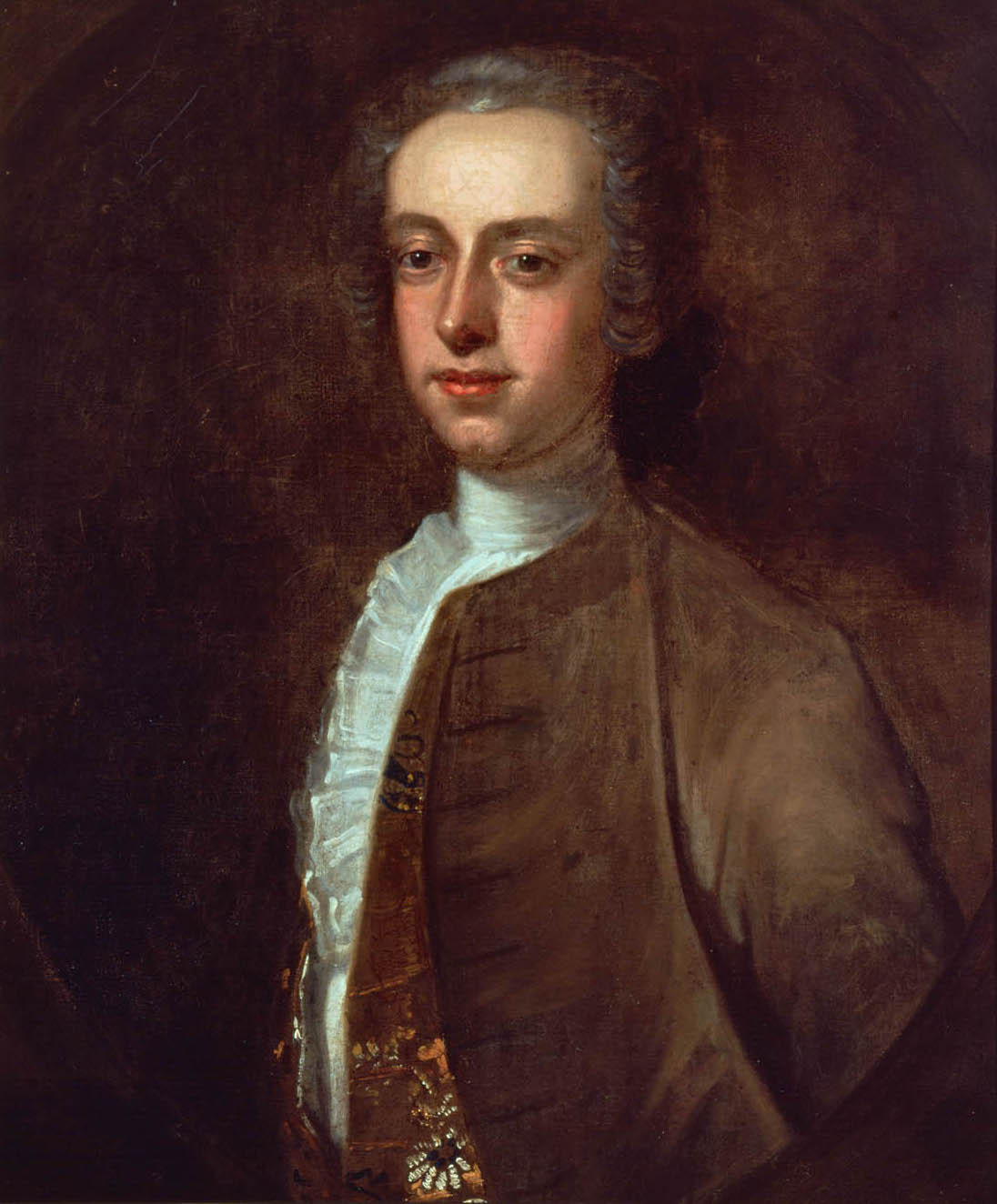
Governor of the Province of Massachusetts Bay Thomas Hutchinson, the author of some of the inflammatory letters

During the 1760s, relations between Great Britain and some of its North American colonies became strained by a series of parliamentary laws, including the 1765 Stamp Act and the 1767 Townshend Acts, which were intended to raise revenue for the crown and to assert the British Parliament's authority to pass such legislation despite the lack of colonial representation. The laws had sparked strong protests in the Thirteen Colonies. In particular, first New York City and later the Province of Massachusetts Bay saw significant unrest and direct action against crown officials. The introduction of British Army troops into Boston in 1768 further raised tensions, which escalated to the Boston Massacre in 1770.

In the years after the enactment of the Townshend Acts, Massachusetts Lieutenant Governor Thomas Hutchinson and his colonial secretary and brother-in-law, Andrew Oliver, wrote a series of letters concerning the acts, the protests against them, and suggestions on how to respond to Thomas Whately, an assistant to British Prime Minister George Grenville. Whately died in 1772, and his papers were turned over to his brother William.

Whately, at one point, gave access to his brother's papers to John Temple, another colonial official who sought to recover letters of his own from those papers.

Hutchinson was appointed governor of Massachusetts in 1770 after the critical publication by opposition politicians of letters that had been written by his predecessor, Francis Bernard. Over the next two years, Hutchinson engaged in an extended and rancorous written debate with the provincial assembly and the governor's council, both of which were dominated by radical leadership, which was hostile to parliamentary authority. The debate centered on the arbitrariness of executive prerogative and the role of Parliament in colonial governance, and it greatly deepened divisions in the province.

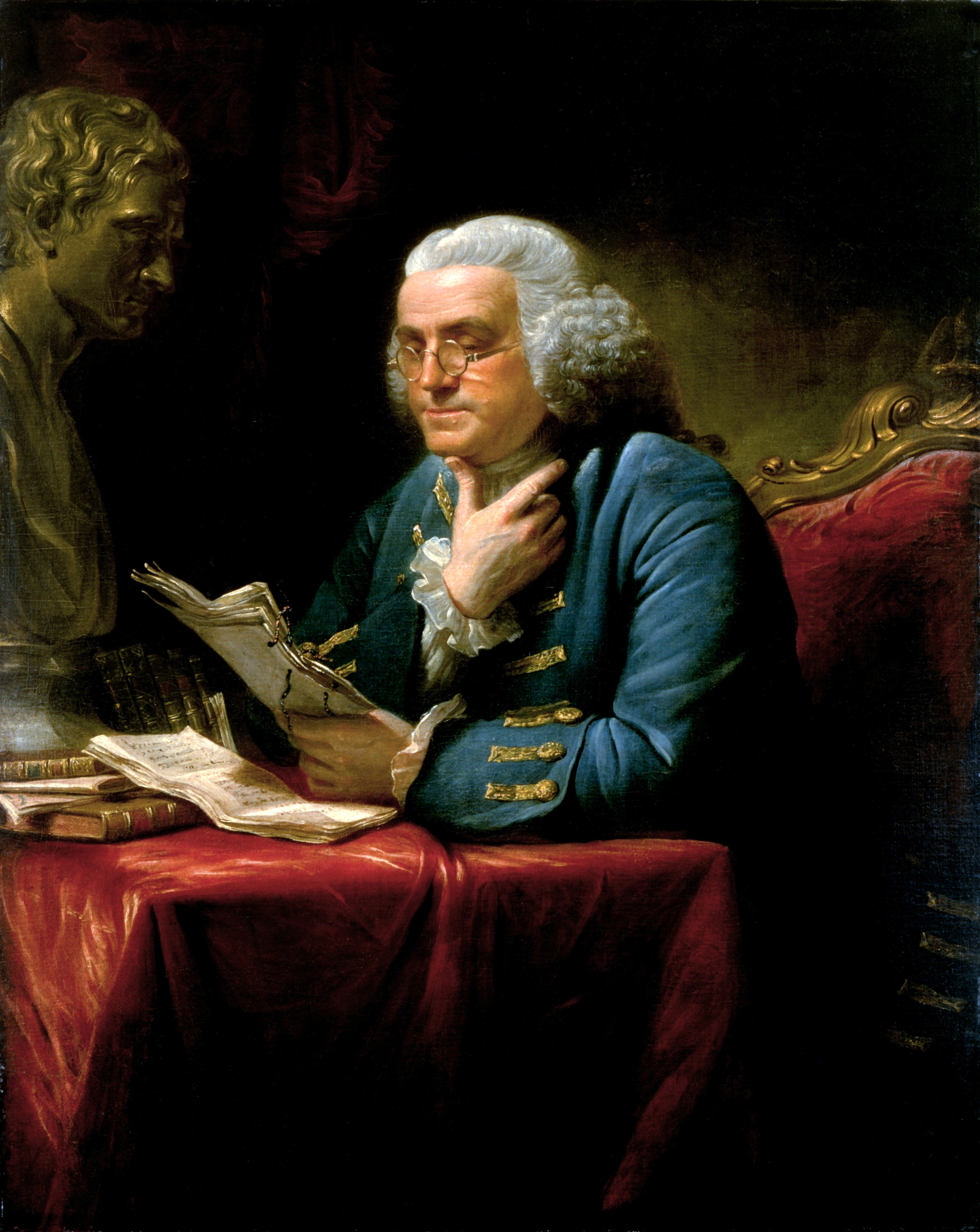
Portrait of Benjamin Franklin by David Martin, 1767

The Massachusetts debate reached a pitch in England when the colonial secretary, Lord Dartmouth, insisted for Benjamin Franklin, who was acting as agent for Massachusetts in London, to demand for the Massachusetts assembly to retract its response to a speech that the governor had given early in 1772 as part of the ongoing debate.

Franklin had acquired a packet of about twenty letters, which had been written to Whately.

Upon reading them, Franklin concluded that Hutchinson and Oliver had mischaracterized the situation in the colonies and thus had misled Parliament. He felt that wider knowledge of the letters would then focus colonial anger away from Parliament and towards those who had written the misleading letters.

Franklin sent the letters to Thomas Cushing, the speaker of the Massachusetts assembly, in December 1772. He insisted to Cushing for them not be published or widely circulated. Franklin specifically wrote that they should be seen only by a few people and that Cushing was not "at liberty to make the letters public."

The letters arrived in Massachusetts in March 1773 and came into the hands of Samuel Adams, who was serving as the clerk of the Massachusetts assembly. By Franklin's instructions, only a select few people, including the Massachusetts Committee of Correspondence, were to see the letters.

Alarmed at what they read, Cushing wrote Franklin to ask if the restrictions on their circulation could be eased. In a response received by Cushing in early June, Franklin reiterated that they were not to be copied or published, but they could be shown to anyone.

== Publication ==
A longtime opponent of Hutchinson's, Samuel Adams narrowly followed Franklin's request, but managed to orchestrate a propaganda campaign against Hutchinson without immediately disclosing the letters. He informed the assembly of the existence of the letters, after which it designated a committee to analyze them. Strategic leaks suggestive of their content made their way into the press and political discussions, causing Hutchinson much discomfort. The assembly eventually concluded, according to John Hancock, that in the letters Hutchinson sought to "overthrow the Constitution of this Government, and to introduce arbitrary Power into the Province", and called for the removal of Hutchinson and Oliver. Hutchinson complained that Adams and the opposition were misrepresenting what he had written, and that nothing he had written in them on the subject of Parliamentary supremacy went beyond other statements he had made. The letters were finally published in the Boston Gazette in mid-June 1773, causing a political firestorm in Massachusetts and raising significant questions in England.

== Content ==
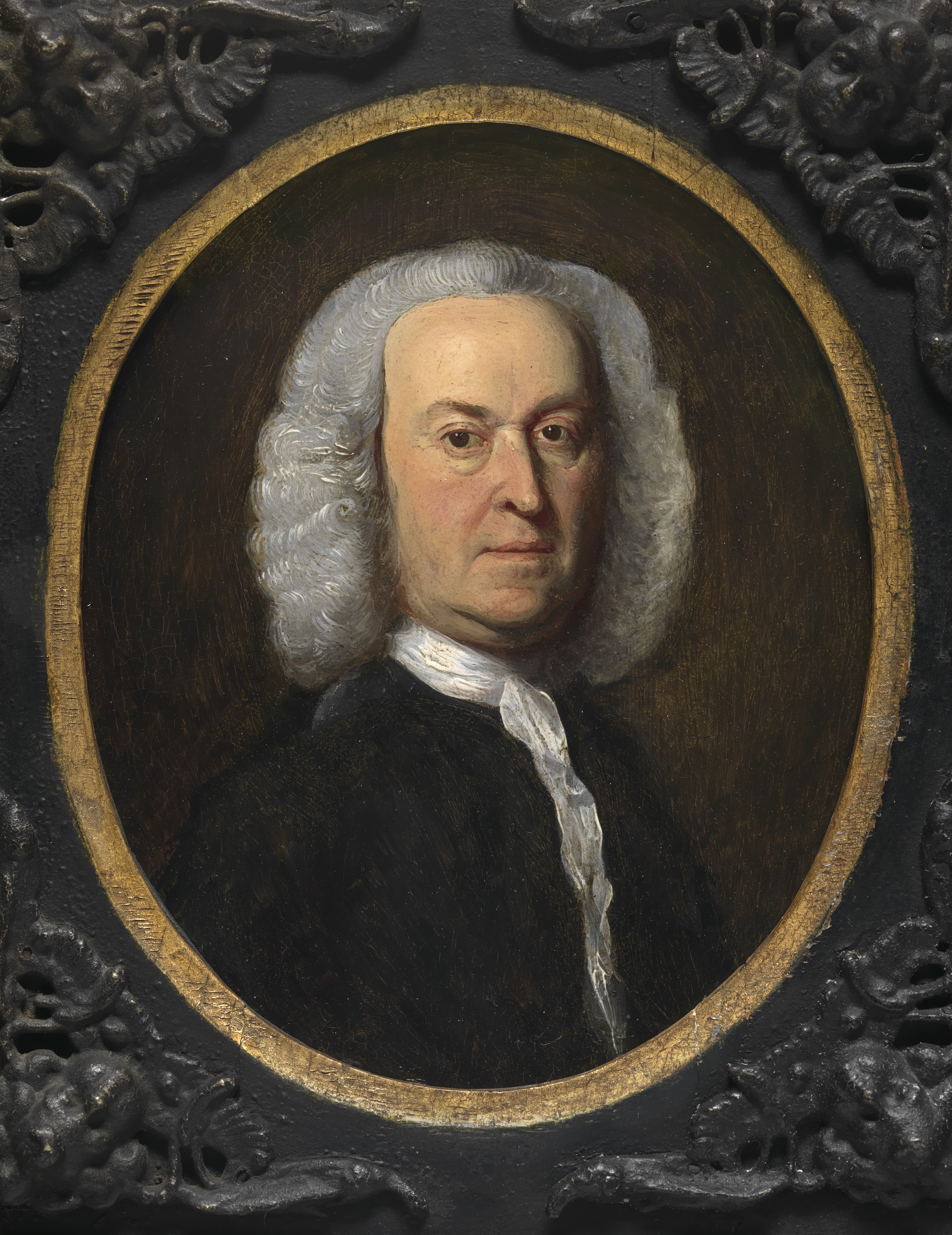
Andrew Oliver, portrait by John Singleton Copley, c. 1758

The letters were written primarily in 1768 and 1769, principally by Hutchinson and Oliver, but the published letters also included some written by Charles Paxton, a customs official and Hutchinson supporter, and Hutchinson's nephew Nathaniel Rogers. The letters written by Oliver (who became lieutenant governor when Hutchinson became governor) proposed a significant revamping of the Massachusetts government to strengthen the executive, and those of Hutchinson were ruminations on the difficult state of affairs in the province. The historian Bernard Bailyn confirms Hutchinson's own assertion that much of the content of his letters expressed relatively little that had not already been publicly stated.

According to Bailyn, Hutchinson's ruminations included the observation that it was impossible for colonists have the full rights they would have in the home country, essentially requiring an "abridgement of what are called English liberties". Hutchinson, unlike Oliver, made no specific proposals on how the colonial government should be reformed and wrote in a letter that was not among those published, "I can think of nothing but what will produce as great an evil as that which it may remove or will be of a very uncertain event." Oliver's letters, in contrast, specifically proposed for the governor's council, whose members were then elected by the assembly with the governor's consent, to be changed to one whose members were appointed by the crown.

== Consequences ==
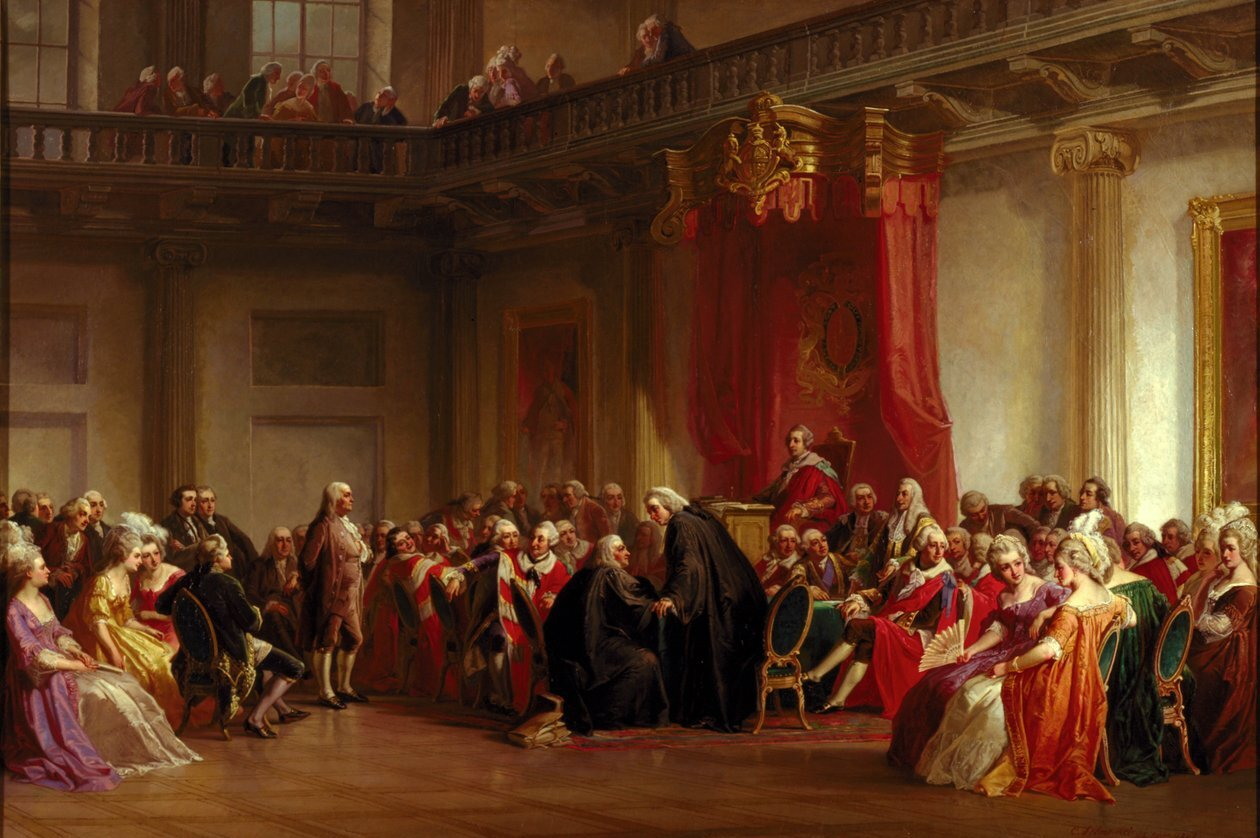
Christian Schussele painting depicting Benjamin Franklin's appearance before the Privy Council

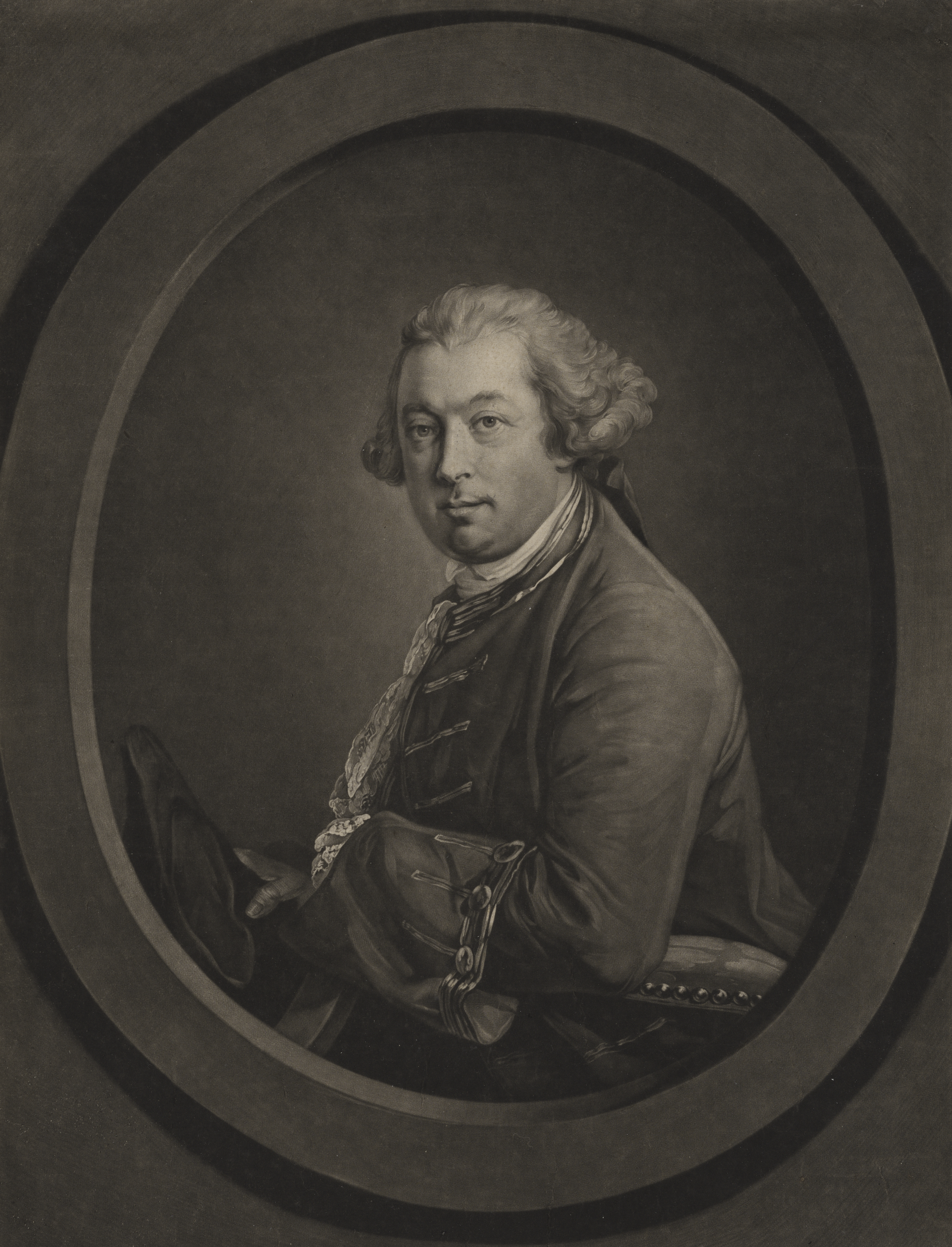
Thomas Pownall, who may have given Franklin the letters

In England, speculation ran rampant over the source of the leak. William Whately accused John Temple of taking the letters, which Temple denied, challenging Whately to a duel. Whately was wounded in the encounter in early December 1773, but neither participant was satisfied, and a second duel was planned. In order to forestall that event, Franklin on Christmas Day published a letter admitting that he was responsible for the acquisition and transmission of the letters, to prevent "further mischief". He justified his actions by pointing out that the letters had been written between public officials for the purpose of influencing public policy.

When Hutchinson's opponents in Massachusetts read the letters, they seized on key phrases (including the "abridgement" phrase) to argue that Hutchinson was in fact lobbying the London government to make changes that would effect such an abridgement. Combined with Oliver's explicit recommendations for reform, they presented this as a clear indication that the provincial leaders were working against the interests of the people and not for them.

Bostonians were outraged at the content of the published letters, burning Hutchinson and Oliver in effigy on Boston Common. The letters were widely reprinted throughout the British North American colonies, and acts of protest took place as far away as Philadelphia. The Massachusetts assembly and governor's council petitioned the Board of Trade for Hutchinson's removal. In the Privy Council hearing concerning Hutchinson's fate, in which the aftermath of the Boston Tea Party was also discussed, Franklin stood silently while he was lambasted by Solicitor General Alexander Wedderburn for his role in the affair. He was accused of thievery and dishonor, and called the prime mover in England on behalf of Boston's radical Committee of Correspondence. The Board of Trade dismissed Franklin from his post as colonial Postmaster General, and dismissed the petition for Hutchinson's removal as "groundless" and "vexatious". Parliament then passed the so-called "Coercive Acts", a package of measures designed to punish Massachusetts for the tea party. Hutchinson was recalled, and the Massachusetts governorship was given to the commander of British forces in North America, Lieutenant General Thomas Gage. Hutchinson left Massachusetts in May 1774, never to return. Andrew Oliver suffered a stroke and died in March 1774.

Gage's implementation of the Coercive Acts further raised tensions that led to the outbreak of the American Revolutionary War in April 1775. Franklin, who had been politically neutral with respect to the colonial radicals prior to his appearance before the Board of Trade, returned to America in early 1775, committed to independence. He went on to serve in the Second Continental Congress and became a leading figure in the American Revolution.

== Franklin's source ==
A number of candidates have been proposed as the means by which Franklin obtained the letters. John Temple, despite his political differences with Hutchinson, apparently managed to convince the latter in 1774 that he was not involved in their acquisition. He, however, claimed to know who was involved but refused to name him because that would "prove the ruin of the guilty party."

Several historians (including Bernard Bailyn and Bernard Knollenberg) have concluded that Thomas Pownall was the probable source of the letters. Pownall was Massachusetts governor before Francis Bernard, had similar views to Franklin on colonial matters and had access to centers of colonial administration through his brother John, the colonial under-secretary.

Other individuals have also been suggested, but all appear to have an only tenuous connection to Franklin or to the situation. The historian Kenneth Penegar believes the question will remain unanswerable unless new documents emerge to shed light on the episode.

== Sources ==
- Alexander, John (2011). Samuel Adams: The Life of an American Revolutionary. Lanham, MD: Rowman and Littlefield. ISBN 978-0-7425-7033-7. OCLC 678924183.
- Bailyn, Bernard (1974). The Ordeal of Thomas Hutchinson. Cambridge, MA: Harvard University Press. ISBN 978-0-674-64160-0. OCLC 6825524.
- Bell, Whitfield (1997). Patriot-Improvers: Biographical Sketches of Members of the American Philosophical Society. Philadelphia: American Philosophical Society. ISBN 978-0-87169-226-9. OCLC 246214730.
- Danver, Steven (2010). Revolts, Protests, Demonstrations, and Rebellions in American History. Santa Barbara, CA: ABC-CLIO. ISBN 978-1-59884-221-0. OCLC 475446571.
- Fischer, David Hackett (1994). Paul Revere's Ride. New York: Oxford University Press. ISBN 0-19-508847-6.
- Galvin, John (1976). Three Men of Boston. New York: Thomas Y. Crowell. ISBN 9780690010183. OCLC 1530708.
- Hosmer, John Kendall (1896). The Life of Thomas Hutchinson. Boston: Houghton, Mifflin. ISBN 9780722267110. OCLC 1527164.
- Isaacson, Walter (2004). Benjamin Franklin: An American Life. New York: Simon & Schuster. ISBN 9780743258074.
- Knollenberg, Bernhard (1975). Growth of the American Revolution, 1766–1775. New York: Free Press. ISBN 978-0-02-917110-3. OCLC 1416300.
- Morgan, Edmund (2003) [2002]. Benjamin Franklin. New Haven, CT: Yale University Press. ISBN 9780300101621. OCLC 224091444.
- Penegar, Kenneth (2011). The Political Trial of Benjamin Franklin. New York: Algora Publishing. ISBN 9780875868493. OCLC 696296728.
- Walmsley, Andrew Stephen (2000). Thomas Hutchinson and the Origins of the American Revolution. New York: New York University Press. ISBN 978-0-8147-9370-1. OCLC 228273378.
- Wright, Esmond (1988). Franklin of Philadelphia. Cambridge, MA: Harvard University Press. ISBN 978-0-674-31809-0. OCLC 12751540.
