= Belle (2013 film) =

British film directed by Amma Asante

- Theatrical release poster
- Directed by: Amma Asante
- Written by: Misan Sagay
- Produced by: Damian Jones
- Starring: Gugu Mbatha-Raw; Tom Wilkinson; Sam Reid; Sarah Gadon; Miranda Richardson; Penelope Wilton; Tom Felton; James Norton; Matthew Goode; Emily Watson
- Cinematography: Ben Smithard
- Edited by: Pia Di Ciaula; Victoria Boydell
- Music by: Rachel Portman
- Production companies: DJ Films; Pinewood Pictures; BFI
- Distributed by: Fox Searchlight Pictures
- Release dates: 8 September 2013 (TIFF); 13 June 2014 (United Kingdom)
- Running time: 104 minutes
- Country: United Kingdom
- Language: English
- Budget: $10.9 million
- Box office: $16.5 million

Belle is a 2013 British period drama film directed by Amma Asante, written by Misan Sagay and produced by Damian Jones. It stars Gugu Mbatha-Raw, Tom Wilkinson, Miranda Richardson, Penelope Wilton, Sam Reid, Matthew Goode, Emily Watson, Sarah Gadon, Tom Felton, and James Norton.

The film is loosely inspired by the 1779 painting of Dido Elizabeth Belle beside her cousin Lady Elizabeth Murray at Kenwood House, which was commissioned by their great-uncle, William Murray, 1st Earl of Mansfield, then Lord Chief Justice of England. Very little is known about the life of Dido Belle, who was born in the West Indies and was the illegitimate mixed-race daughter of Mansfield's nephew, Sir John Lindsay. She is found living in poverty by her father and entrusted to the care of Mansfield and his wife. The fictionalised story centres on Dido's relationship with an aspiring lawyer; it is set at a time of legal significance, as a court case is heard on what became known as the Zong massacre, when slaves were thrown overboard from a slave ship and the owner filed with his insurance company for the losses. Lord Mansfield ruled on this case in England's Court of King's Bench in 1786, in a decision seen to contribute to the Slave Trade Act 1807.

== Plot ==
Dido Elizabeth Belle Lindsay is born in 1761, the illegitimate daughter of Royal Navy officer Captain Sir John Lindsay, and enslaved African woman Maria Belle in the West Indies. After Dido's mother dies in 1769, Lindsay takes Dido to England and entrusts her to his uncle William Murray, Earl of Mansfield, the Lord Chief Justice, and his wife Elizabeth, who live at the estate Kenwood House in Hampstead, near London.

They raise Dido as a free gentlewoman with their other great-niece Lady Elizabeth Murray, whose widowed father had remarried a woman who pressured him to disown her. When the cousins reach adulthood, the Mansfields commission a portrait of them, but Dido fears she will be portrayed as a subordinate, similar to other portraits which depict aristocrats with black servants.

Dido's father dies, leaving her a vast income of £2,000 a year, making her an heiress. Lady Elizabeth, by contrast, will have no income from her father, as his son with his new wife has been named sole heir. Arrangements are made for Elizabeth to have her coming-out to society, but Lord and Lady Mansfield believe no gentleman will agree to marry Dido because of her mixed race.

Fearing lower-ranking men will only marry Dido for her wealth, and that a marriage to a lower-status man will reduce her rank and shame the family, Lord Mansfield decides she will travel to London with her cousin but will not be "out" to society. He asks her to take her spinster great-aunt Mary's place as the keeper of the house, with the implication that she will not marry.

Lord Mansfield agrees to take the local vicar's son, John Davinier, into a law pupillage. In 1783, Mansfield hears the case of Gregson v. Gilbert, about an insurance claim for slaves killed when thrown overboard by the captain of a slave-ship. Dido helps her uncle with his correspondence.

After John tells Dido about the case, she begins sneaking correspondence to him which he believes will advance abolitionism. Lord Mansfield and John disagree about the case; John is told to leave, not to see Dido again, and his pupillage is at an end.

Dido's aunts, Lady Mansfield and Lady Mary Murray, seek to steer Dido into an engagement with Oliver Ashford, younger brother to the bigoted James Ashford. At first, James is interested in Elizabeth but stops courting her once he discovers she will have no inheritance. Oliver, who has no fortune, proposes to Dido and she accepts, but continues to see John in secret. James takes Dido aside, tells her she will disgrace his family's name, then insults and gropes her.

Dido tells Elizabeth of James' true character, offering to give her part of her own inheritance as a dowry so she can find a different match. Lord Mansfield finds out about Dido's visits to John and confronts them, and John professes his love for her. Dido then meets Oliver and breaks off their engagement.

Dido is relieved when the painting is unveiled, since she is shown as Elizabeth's equal. She tells Lord Mansfield that the portrait commission proves that he can defy convention.

Dido sneaks into the court to hear Lord Mansfield narrowly rule that the slave-trading syndicate is not due insurance payments for the slaves whom the crew threw overboard during the voyage. The ship's officers claimed they ordered this action because they were out of drinking water, but Lord Mansfield had discovered that the ship passed by many ports without stopping for more, before murdering the slaves. The slaves' quarters were overcrowded, making them sick and not likely to fetch a high price at auction, so the officers had decided they would be worth more in insurance payments after their "loss", and threw them overboard.

When Lord Mansfield sees John and Dido outside the court after his ruling, he says that she can only marry a gentleman. Therefore, he agrees to resume John's pupillage, so that he can become a lawyer. Dido and John embrace, in acknowledgement of their romantic feelings.

In the credits we see Dido and John married, having two sons. Elizabeth also married and had three children, and their joint portrait hung at Kenwood House until 1922, when it was moved to Scone Palace near Perth, the birthplace of Lord Mansfield.

== Cast ==
- Gugu Mbatha-Raw as Dido Elizabeth Belle, the protagonist. She is a strong-willed and well-educated young woman, born from Captain Sir John Lindsay's affair with an enslaved woman. Since her father acknowledged her as his child and later left her a considerable inheritance, she is part of society and free not to pursue a marriage. She gradually befriends John Davinier over the Zong case, and her input eventually leads Lord Mansfield to rule against the traders.
- Tom Wilkinson as William Murray, 1st Earl of Mansfield, the great-uncle of Dido and Elizabeth (Dido's father being the son of Lord Mansfield's sister, and Elizabeth's father the son of Lord Mansfield's brother), who is their guardian since they were children, and whom they address as "Papa". As Lord Chief Justice, he is the most powerful judge in England. Upon Dido's arrival at his mansion, he takes to loving her as if she was his own, despite her heritage.
- Sam Reid as John Davinier, a vicar's son who seeks apprenticeship from Lord Mansfield in pursuit of a career as a lawyer. He is idealistic and passionate in his moral convictions, and meets with an abolitionist group.
- Emily Watson as Elizabeth Murray, Countess of Mansfield, whom the girls address as "Mama". She is very caring toward her nieces, although she sees order and etiquette as essential. She tries very hard to find Elizabeth a suitable match.
- Sarah Gadon as Lady Elizabeth Murray, Elizabeth is cheerful and affectionate toward her cousin Dido, and the two of them have been inseparable since childhood, considering themselves sisters. Due to Elizabeth's father having a male heir from his second marriage, she is left without a dowry, which complicates her finding a suitable husband.
- Miranda Richardson as Lady Ashford, a scheming lady who attempts to marry off her two sons to the Mansfield girls. She feels contempt for Dido's heritage, but she is able to put that aside in order to let her son James get his hands on Dido's dowry.
- Penelope Wilton as Lady Mary Murray, the manager of the household and governess of Dido and Elizabeth. Her demeanour is firm but caring, and she teaches Elizabeth and Dido about etiquette, music and embroidery. She is a spinster but had a one-time gentleman caller, whom her mother prevented her from marrying.
- Tom Felton as James Ashford, the malevolent firstborn of Lord and Lady Ashford who also shares his mother's contempt for Dido's heritage and sexually assaults her at one point. He courts Elizabeth until he discovers her impoverished status.
- James Norton as Oliver Ashford, the younger son of Lord and Lady Ashford. He is attracted to Dido's beauty and wealth, but he is not completely immune from his family's prejudices.
- Matthew Goode as Captain Sir John Lindsay, the birth father of Dido. After Dido's mother died, he acknowledged his daughter and took her to the Mansfield household, asking his uncle and aunt to take her into their guardianship. He dies while Dido is still young.
- Alex Jennings as Lord Ashford, a high-ranking judge and Lady Ashford's husband. He hurries Lord Mansfield toward a decision on the Zong case, and has a kinder disposition than his wife and sons.
- Bethan Mary-James as Mabel, a dark-skinned servant at the Mansfield household. Dido worries that she may be a slave, but Lord Mansfield assures her Mabel is free and being paid a "very respectable" wage.
- James Northcote as Mr Vaughn, Elizabeth's more gentle suitor.

== Painting ==
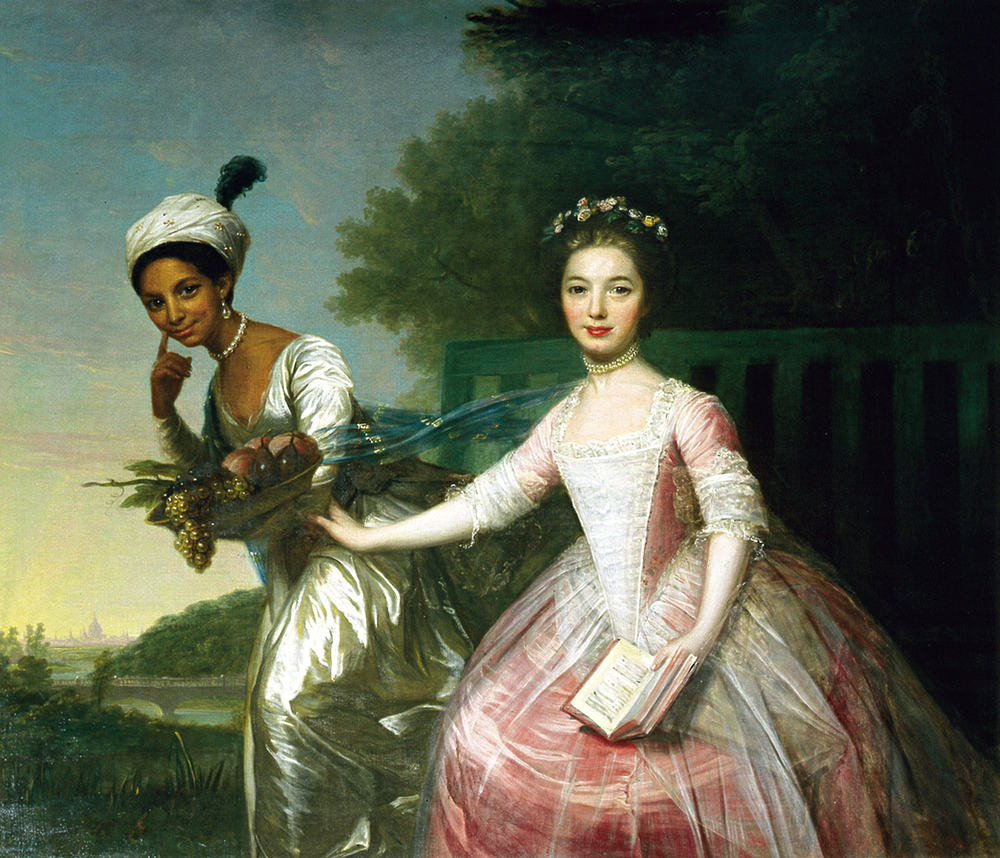
Dido Elizabeth Belle and Lady Elizabeth Murray by David Martin, 1778. Painting of Dido Elizabeth Belle (1761–1804) and her cousin Lady Elizabeth Murray (1760–1825).

The 1778 painting, once thought to be by Johann Zoffany, is now attributed to David Martin. The painting hung in Kenwood House until 1922 and now hangs at Scone Palace in Perthshire, Scotland. It was one of the first European portraits to portray a black subject on an equal eye-line with a white aristocrat, though distinctions are implied by the poses, as Elizabeth's "formality and bookishness are contrasted with the wild and exotically turbanned 'natural' figure of Belle."

The painting is replicated in the film with the faces of the actresses portraying the characters replacing those in the original. Dido's finger-to-cheek gesture is absent in the fictionalised version, as is her feathered turban. The original picture is shown on screen at the end of the film.

== Production ==
Filming began on 24 September 2012. The film was shot on location in the Isle of Man, Oxford and London. It is the first major British motion picture to be shot in true-4K, using Sony's F65 CineAlta digital production camera. The film was produced by DJ Films, Isle of Man Film, and Pinewood Pictures with support from the BFI.

Production designer Simon Bowles created the 18th-century Bristol Docks on the Isle of Man and created a set for Kenwood House, based on a number of stately homes in the London area.

Original music for the film was composed by Rachel Portman.

== Historical accuracy ==
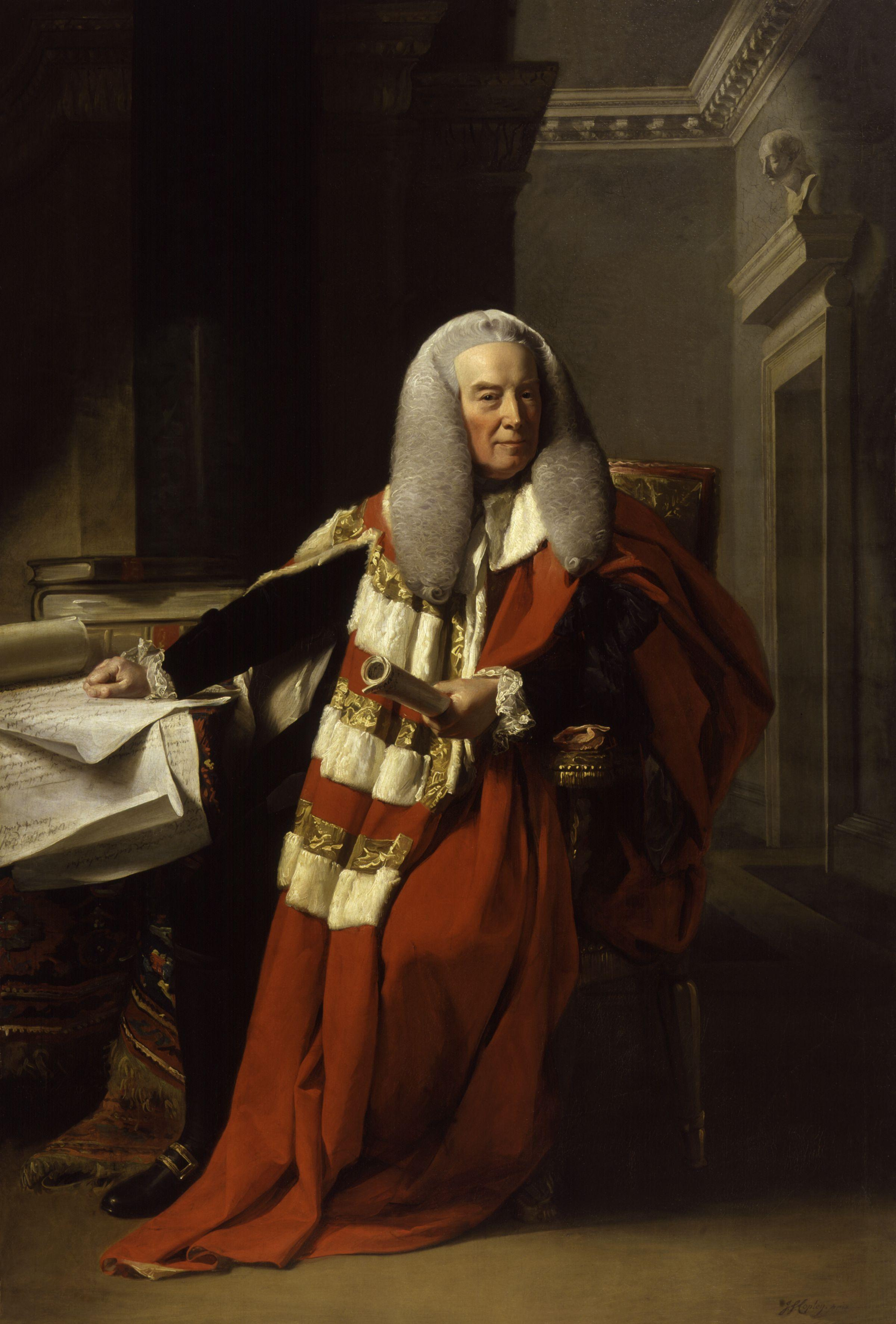
Portrait of Lord Mansfield by John Singleton Copley, 1783

Sagay chose to set the major events, Belle's and Elizabeth's love affairs and the Zong case, in the same year the painting was made – when Belle was about 18. In reality, Belle married at 32, long after Lady Elizabeth was married and no longer in touch with Belle.

Sir John Lindsay died on 4 June 1788, when Lady Elizabeth has been married years before and no longer lived in Kenwood. Dido was 27 years old at the time of her father's death.

John Davinier was in real life a French manservant, not an English apprentice lawyer. John Daviniere was 7 years younger than Dido. In the film, Dido was married to Davinier when she was 18, therefore John would only be 11 years old at the time.

James Walvin, professor emeritus at the University of York, said of Belle: "Much of the historical evidence is there – though festooned in the film with imaginary relishes and fictional tricks. Partly accurate, the whole thing reminded me of the classic Morecambe and Wise sketch with André Previn (Eric bashing away on the piano): all the right notes – but not necessarily in the right order." Reviewing the film for History Extra, the official website of BBC History Magazine, Walvin noted that while the second half of the film centres on Dido Elizabeth Belle's involvement in the Zong case, in reality she was "nowhere to be found in the Zong affair". In the film "Tom Wilkinson's Mansfield finds his cold legal commercial heart softened, and edged towards abolition by the eyelash-fluttering efforts of his stunning great niece" and his "adjudication becomes, not a point of law, but the first bold assertion towards the end of slavery". Walvin points out that "he merely stated that there should be another hearing of the Zong case – this time with evidence not known at the earlier hearing". Walvin awarded the film one star for enjoyment and two for historical accuracy.

Dido Elizabeth Belle was never given her father's last name of Lindsay; instead she took her mother's last name Belle. She was baptised in London aged 6 by Maria but John Lindsay was absent from the baptism. In the movie it was said that Dido's mother was dead so no one could take care of Dido, and Sir John Lindsay took Dido to be taken care of by his maternal Uncle. In real life, Dido's mother Maria Belle was alive, Maria was a 14 year old when Dido was conceived and 15 when she gave birth to Dido, Maria was later given property by Sir John Lindsay in Pensacola, Florida and purchased her freedom in 1774. Sir John Lindsay fathered a total of five illegitimate children from 5 different women. Dido Belle in June 1761, John Edward Lindsay on 9 February 1762, Ann in November 1766, Elizabeth in December 1766, and John Lindsay in November 1767.

According to colonial law at the time, Dido's actual birthright as the daughter of a slave woman, was that she would have been considered by law a slave herself, and didn't have any rights nor freedom. Additionally as an illegitimate child, Dido also didn't have rights to her father's name, social position, or property.

Real Dido would also be in charge of some chores normal for genteel women, but many doubt that Lady Elizabeth did any of these tasks. As remarked by Thomas Hutchinson from his visit to Kenwood.

"She is a sort of Superintendent over the dairy, poultry yard, &c., which we visited, and she was called upon by my Lord every minute for this thing and that, and shewed the greatest attention to everything he said." "A Black came in after dinner and sat with the ladies, and after coffee, walked with the company in the gardens, one of the young ladies having her arm within the other. She had a very high cap, and her wool was much frizzled in her neck, but not enough to answer the large curls now in fashion. I knew her history before, but my Lord mentioned it again. Sir Lindsay, having taken her mother prisoner in a Spanish vessel, brought her to England, where she delivered of this girl, of which she was then with child, and which was taken care of by Lord M., and has been educated by his family. He calls her Dido, which I suppose is all the name she has. He knows he has been reproached for showing a fondness for her – I dare say not criminal"

Because Dido was in charge of dairy and poultry yard, some experts said it was unlikely that she would have worn a fancy dress like her cousin Elizabeth would, as it would get spoiled by the dirt, Dido was also described wearing a "very high cap" with frizzy hair.

In real life, Lord Mansfield never actually acknowledged Dido as his great niece, unlike in the film. Lord Mansfield seemed to have disguised the fact that Dido was his great niece from his friend Thomas Hutchinson; this created an implication that Hutchinson suggested in his diaries she was Mansfield's mistress. More evidence came from Mansfield's will written in 1785. In his will, Mansfield does not refer to Dido as his niece, whereas Mansfield referred to Lady Elizabeth, Lady Anne, and Lady Marjory Murray as his nieces. So the possibility of Dido being introduced to society as Mansfield's nieces like Lady Elizabeth or as portrayed in the film would have been quite low.

Dido Belle was also given an annual allowance of £20 with an additional £10 for her birthday. By contrast, Lady Elizabeth received £100 excluding her birthday.

Dido's social position within the household was also not as presented in the film. In the film it was suggested that they were treated equally in the household, and that she would attend family parties; but that was not really the case, although Mansfield loved Dido, in real life she was treated as an illegitimate and poor relation, as American visitor Hutchinson reported in 1779: Dido was not allowed to dine with the family and guests (as depicted in the film) but joined the upper class ladies for coffee afterwards in the drawing-room. Dido was also responsible for the dairy and poultry yards at Kenwood and carried out menial tasks for Lord Mansfield. Years later, more evidence of her awkward position was found from Mary Hamilton's diary in 1784, when she visited her cousin Lady Stormont (Elizabeth's stepmother) and the Murray family at Kenwood. Although she mentioned Lady Elizabeth in her diaries, she never mentioned Dido Belle, despite Mary's numerous visits to Kenwood House, in which she had described all members of the Murray family including Lady Elizabeth, Lady Elizabeth's three half siblings, two unmarried aunts, Lord Mansfield, and even the parish priest. This might indicate that she never saw Dido despite her multiple visits to Kenwood, and saw the Murray family at church. From Mary's diary, Dido seemed to not join the family or Lady Elizabeth at church and she was further absent when Mary Hamilton was given tour of Kenwood House by Lady Elizabeth, it is possible that as Dido got older, Lord Mansfield further reinforced her position as illegitimate relations, Dido was also absent when Lady Elizabeth went to a royal ball with her stepmother.

Dido Belle's real inheritance was nowhere near the amount suggested in the film. Dido was not left anything by her father; Dido's father was a naval officer and died in 1788, when Lady Elizabeth had married in 1785 and no longer lived at Kenwood; he died without legitimate heirs, bequeathing £1000 to be shared by his "reputed children", another two illegitimate children named John and Elizabeth Lindsay (as noted in his will) and nothing for Dido. in 1793, Lord Mansfield bequeathed Dido Belle £500 as an outright sum and a £100 per annum annuity, while he left Lady Elizabeth Murray £10,000, even though her father was in line to inherit his uncle's title and entire wealth, so Lady Elizabeth was far from penniless as suggested in the film. Although left with £500 and an annuity by Mansfield, Dido was far from what 18th century Georgian society would consider an 'heiress', however Lady Elizabeth had about £17,000 upon marriage and in due time, she would receive her two aunts' wealth of £22,000 when they died, making Lady Elizabeth's wealth around £40,000. By comparison the 5th Duke of Devonshire, (one of the richest men in the kingdom) gave £30,000 for the dowry of his daughter Georgiana, 6th Countess of Carlisle.

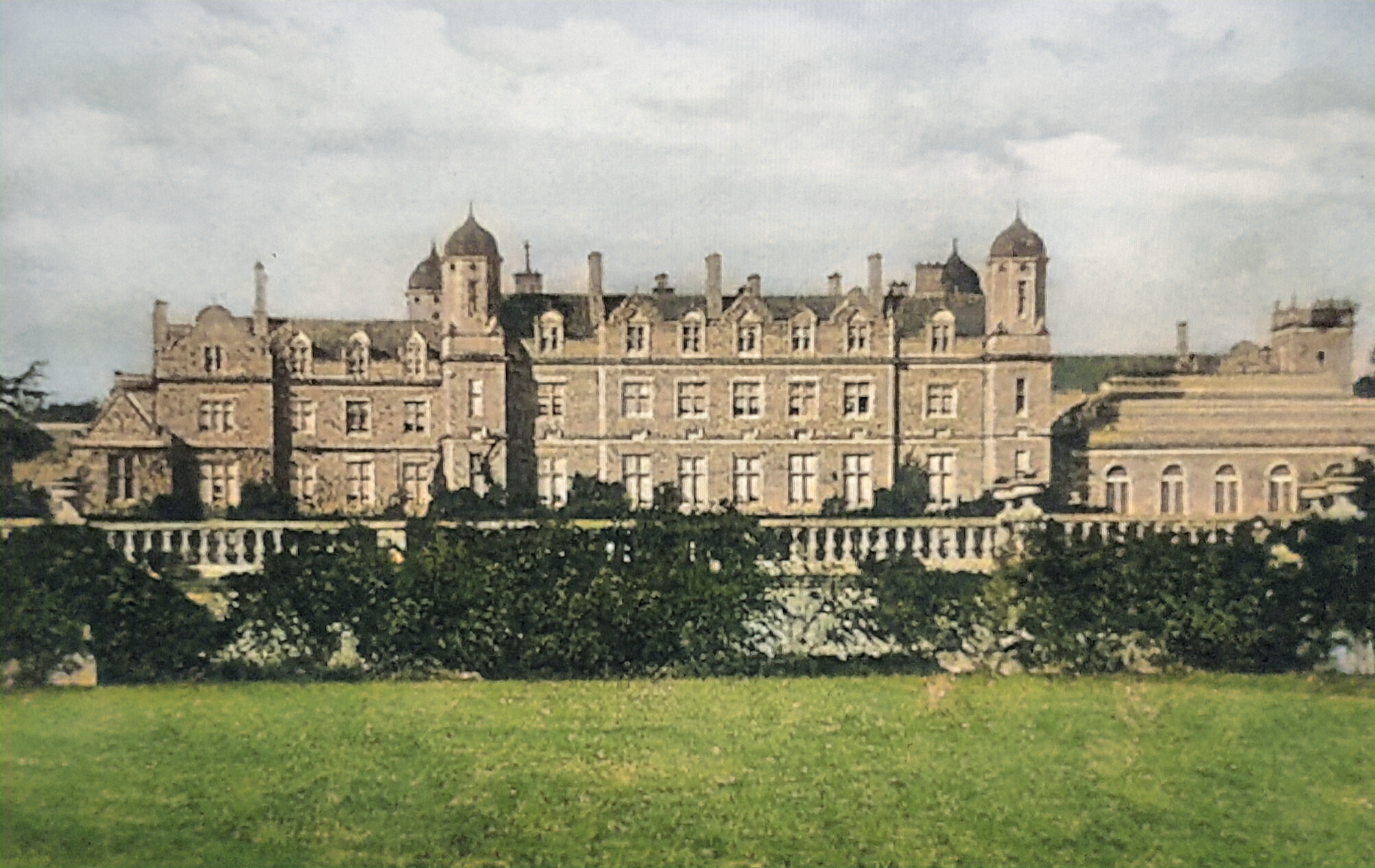
Eastwell Park, Ashford, Kent. Home of Lady Elizabeth and George Finch-Hatton.

In real life, Lady Elizabeth married first aged 25 in 1785 to George Finch Hatton, heir to the Earl of Winchilsea and Earl of Nottingham. George was a wealthy aristocrat with an income of £20,000 a year and two estates, Kirby Hall and Eastwell Park. Meanwhile, Real Dido remained at Kenwood to care for Lord Mansfield and eight years later after his death, at the age of 32 Dido Belle married a servant working as valet called John Davinière. Dido and John eventually resided at 14 Ranelagh Street in Pimlico, their house had 2 rooms on each floor. Dido had 3 sons and she died aged 43 in 1804, Davinière later remarried and had more children.

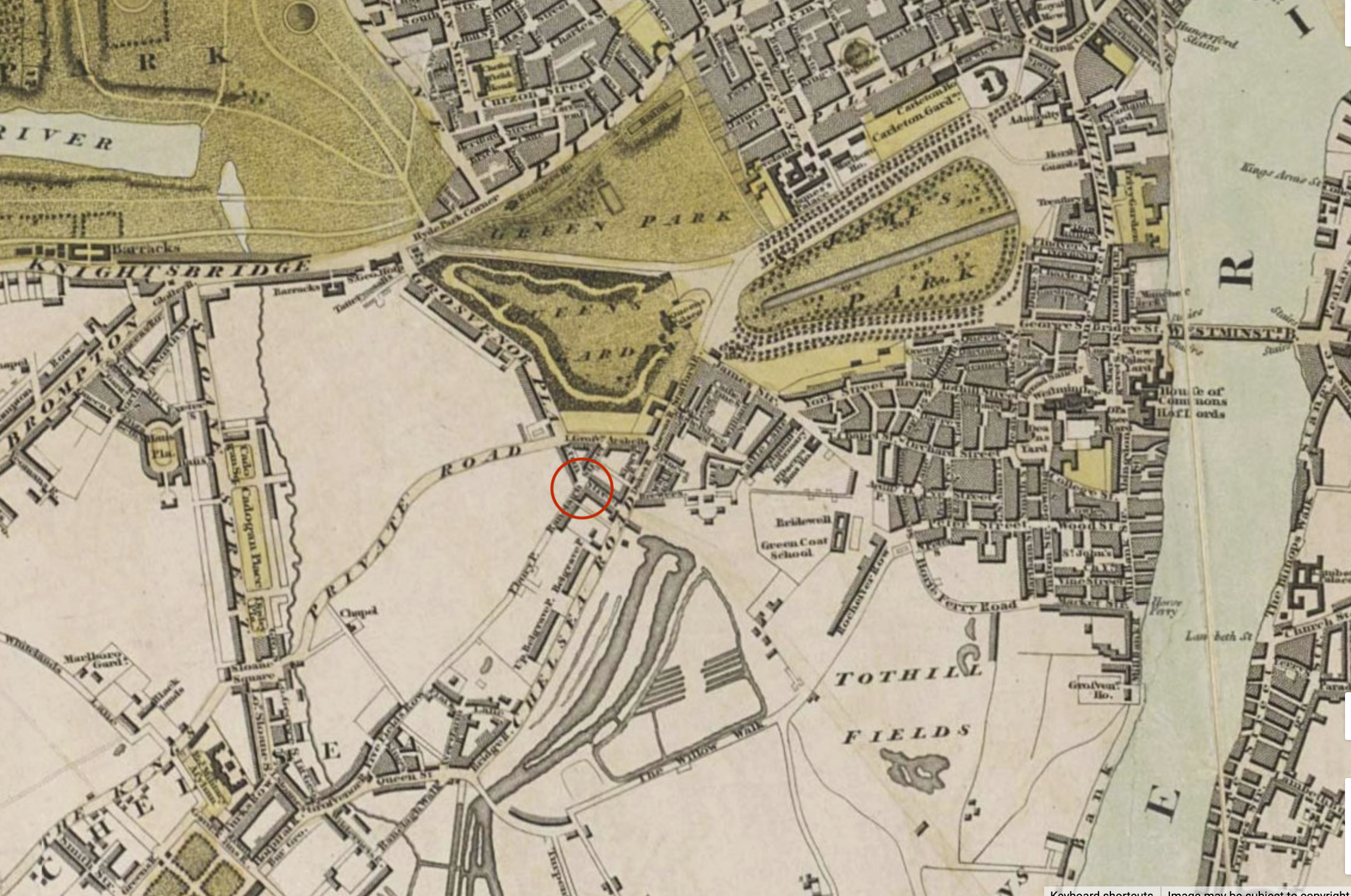
Ranelagh Street, Pimlico at the time was in the outskirt of London. (demolished, replaced by Ebury Street)

Lady Elizabeth in real life was not neglected by her father, the 7th Viscount Stormont was known to be a righteous man much like his uncle; he was an ambassador to Austria and then France, where he met the young Marie Antoinette in Austria and again when she became Queen of France. There he quickly became the Queen's favorite due to his familiar face and kindness from her days in Austria. In 1774 he presented his uncle Lord Mansfield to Marie Antoinette and Louis XVI. The film was set in early 1778, which coincided with Lord Stormont returning to England due to France declaring its support for the American colonies' revolution against the British, and the ambassadors for both countries were recalled in March 1778. From letters found, he would regularly visit Lady Elizabeth, his two unmarried sisters Anne and Marjory Murray, and his uncle, who by now all resided at Kenwood, and Lady Elizabeth would also make visits to her father and stepmother at his home at Wandsworth Hill and his London home; her father would also invite Lady Elizabeth to many royal balls.

Lady Elizabeth's relationship with her stepmother was also very close and warm, the complete opposite to that depicted in the film, as Lady Elizabeth described her stepmother as "our dear Lady Stormont" in one of her letters. Her stepmother was a prominent aristocrat and courtier; her friends included the future King George IV, Georgiana Duchess of Devonshire, her sister the Duchess of Atholl, and her cousin Mary Hamilton. In 1784 Lady Stormont invited her stepdaughter Lady Elizabeth to the Prince's ball at his residence Carlton House.

In the film, Dido was portrayed to be a better pianist than Lady Elizabeth, but in real life Lady Elizabeth was actually known as an expert pianist in the family, and she also liked to compose; this was attested by Mary Hamilton (her stepmother's 1st cousin) and Jane Austen. Mary Hamilton wrote in her diary "went with Miss Eliza Murray ------ she is a remarkably nice & a good Musician for she not only plays in a Masterly manner but is a composer." "She lives with Lord Mansfield & was educated by the ye. late Lady Mansfield & two of Lord Stormont's Sisters who also reside with Lord Mansfield. She is pleasing, good humour'd – well accomplished, & conducts herself with that propriety which ought to distinguish a woman of fashion & good education."

== Historical references ==
The film is a work of historical fiction, inspired by a painting and the evidence that Dido was brought up at Kenwood House. The relative lack of details about Dido Elizabeth Belle allowed screenwriter Misan Sagay considerable artistic licence in framing the young woman's story, within the broader historical context of the slave economy and the abolition movement.

The only other direct historical reference made about Belle, other than the painting and American loyalist Thomas Hutchinson's personal diary, appear in Elements of Moral Science, a 1790 work by the Scottish professor of moral philosophy James Beattie, who met Belle and in the book states she recited poetry with "a degree of elegance" equal to any English child of her age, arguing against the then prevailing theory that "negroes are naturally and utterly incapable of distinct articulation".

William Murray, 1st Earl of Mansfield, who was Lord Chief Justice of England from 1756 to 1788, presided over two important cases, Somerset v Stewart in 1772 and the Zong insurance claims case in 1783, which helped lay the groundwork for Britain's Slave Trade Act 1807. In the film his concluding line at the end of the Zong case – "the state of slavery (is) so odious that nothing can be suffered to support it" – was historically actually quoted by him in the Somerset v Stewart case eleven years before. As in the film, he was the great-uncle of Dido Elizabeth Belle and Lady Elizabeth Murray.

At the suggestion of the producers, HarperCollins published a companion book, Belle – The Slave Daughter and the Lord Chief Justice (2014), by biographer Paula Byrne, recounting the lives of the film's principal characters.

== Authorship ==
Some press coverage ahead of filming cited Asante as the sole writer of Belle as well as director. Press releases that followed Fox Searchlight's acquisition of the film gave the final credit determined by the Writers Guild of America as "Written by Misan Sagay". Sagay claimed she began writing her script in 2004, after seeing the painting of Dido Belle at Scone Palace. The project was initially developed by HBO. It then received funding from the British Film Institute in 2009, but Sagay left the project the following year due to serious ill-health. When Asante was hired, Sagay believed that Asante would edit her script. Instead she learned that a script without her name on was being used.

The subsequent arbitration process undertaken by the Writers Guild of America (WGA) determined that Sagay provided the bulk of content used in the script, so Sagay was awarded sole writing credit. Cast members Penelope Wilton and Tom Wilkinson expressed "incredulity" at the accreditation decision. Wilkinson said he "only saw and worked from a script written by Amma". Information obtained by Entertainment Weekly showed Asante wrote 18 script drafts, before she directed the film. Producers planned to submit Asante and Sagay as co-writers, but Sagay wanted a solo credit. Producer Damian Jones then asked the WGA to give Sagay a "story by" credit, with Asante getting a "screenplay by" credit, but this was rejected. Asante appealed the WGA's decision, but lost.

== Release ==
In July 2013, it was announced that Fox Searchlight Pictures had acquired distribution rights for the film in the UK and USA. Belle premiered at the 2013 Toronto International Film Festival on 8 September 2013. The film was released on 2 May 2014 in the United States, 9 May in Canada and 13 June 2014 in the United Kingdom.

== Home media ==
The film was released on Blu-ray on August 26, 2014 and on DVD on January 6, 2015.

== Reception ==
The film received positive reviews from critics. Review aggregation website Rotten Tomatoes gives the film a score of 84% based on reviews from 150 critics, with an average rating of 6.99/10. The site's consensus states: "It boasts all the surface beauty that fans of period pictures have come to expect, but Belle also benefits from its stirring performances and subtle social consciousness." Critic Mark Kermode named it his fourth-favourite film of 2014.

=== Accolades ===
| Award | Date of ceremony | Category | Recipients and nominees | Result |
|---|---|---|---|---|
| African-American Film Critics Association | 8 December 2014 | Best Actress | Gugu Mbatha-Raw | Won |
| African-American Film Critics Association | 8 December 2014 | Best Film | Belle | Nominated |
| Black Reel Awards | 19 February 2015 | Best Actress | Gugu Mbatha-Raw | Won |
| Black Reel Awards | 19 February 2015 | Best Director | Amma Asante | Nominated |
| Black Reel Awards | 19 February 2015 | Best Ensemble | Toby Whale | Nominated |
| Black Reel Awards | 19 February 2015 | Best Film | Belle | Nominated |
| Black Reel Awards | 19 February 2015 | Best Screenplay | Misan Sagay | Nominated |
| British Independent Film Awards | 7 December 2014 | Best Actress in a British Independent Film | Gugu Mbatha-Raw | Won |
| British Independent Film Awards | 7 December 2014 | Best Newcomer | Gugu Mbatha-Raw | Nominated |
| Chicago Film Critics Association | 15 December 2014 | Most Promising Performer | Gugu Mbatha-Raw | Nominated |
| Empire Awards | 29 March 2015 | Best Female Newcomer | Gugu Mbatha-Raw | Nominated |
| London Film Critics' Circle | 18 January 2015 | British Actress of the Year | Gugu Mbatha-Raw | Nominated |
| Miami International Film Festival | 15 March 2014 | SIGNIS Award | Belle | Won |
| NAACP Image Award | 6 February 2015 | Outstanding Actress in a Motion Picture | Gugu Mbatha-Raw | Nominated |
| NAACP Image Award | 6 February 2015 | Outstanding Directing in a Motion Picture | Amma Asante | Nominated |
| NAACP Image Award | 6 February 2015 | Outstanding Independent Motion Picture | Belle | Won |
| NAACP Image Award | 6 February 2015 | Outstanding Motion Picture | Belle | Nominated |
| NAACP Image Award | 6 February 2015 | Outstanding Writing in a Motion Picture | Misan Sagay | Won |
| Palm Springs International Film Festival | 3–13 January 2014 | Audience Award for Best Narrative Feature | Belle | Nominated |
| Palm Springs International Film Festival | 3–13 January 2014 | Directors to Watch | Amma Asante | Won |
| Satellite Award | 15 February 2015 | Best Actress in a Motion Picture | Gugu Mbatha-Raw | Nominated |
| Satellite Award | 15 February 2015 | Best Costume Design | Anushia Nieradzik | Nominated |
| Women Film Critics Circle | 16 December 2014 | Best Female Images in a Movie | Belle | Nominated |
| Women Film Critics Circle | 16 December 2014 | Best Movie by a Woman | Amma Asante | Nominated |
| Women Film Critics Circle | 16 December 2014 | Best Woman Storyteller | Misan Sagay | Nominated |
| Women Film Critics Circle | 16 December 2014 | Karen Morley Award | Belle | Won |

== See also ==
- List of films featuring slavery
