= An Essay on the Nature and Immutability of Truth =

1770 book by James Beattie

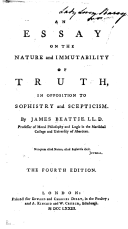
- Author: James Beattie
- Language: English
- Subject: Truth
- Published: 1770
- Publication place: Great Britain
- Media type: Print
- ISBN: 978-1421204208

An Essay on the Nature and Immutability of Truth is a 1770 book about truth by the Scottish philosopher and poet James Beattie. His major work, the book enjoyed great success but angered the philosopher David Hume and has been criticized for Beattie's tendency to denounce his opponents.

== Publication history ==
An Essay on the Nature and Immutability of Truth was first published in 1770. A German translation appeared in 1772, and there were also French and Dutch translations.

== Reception ==
An Essay on the Nature and Immutability of Truth enjoyed great success. It became a bestseller, made Beattie famous, and received the approbation of the writers Edmund Burke and Samuel Johnson. Beattie received numerous honors, including an audience with George III of the United Kingdom, who rewarded him with an annual pension, while the University of Oxford conferred on him the doctorate of civil law. Beattie also posed for the painter Joshua Reynolds. The work was discussed in continental Europe, where its German translation influenced the philosopher Immanuel Kant, helping him to understand Hume and aiding in the development of transcendental idealism. However, Hume reacted with anger to the work, and is said to have remarked of it, "Truth! there is no truth in it; it is a horrible large lie in octavo" and to have referred to Beattie as a "silly bigoted fellow". While it remains Beattie's best known philosophical work, neither its fame nor Beattie's philosophical reputation endured. The philosopher Dugald Stewart concluded in a letter to the writer William Forbes that while it was effective as a "popular antidote against the illusions of metaphysical scepticism" it lacked the subtlety, patience, and precision of Reid's work.

The philosopher Frederick Copleston commented that Beattie "indulged in declamation and diatribe in passages which were doubtless the expression of sincere indignation but which seem rather out of place in a philosophical work." He concluded that Beattie, "tends to give the impression that he has very little use for philosophy except as a means of attacking philosophies and philosophers." The philosopher Patricia Kitcher described An Essay on the Nature and Immutability of Truth as Beattie's "major work". Douglas McDermid argued that while Beattie's work was not an improvement over the philosopher Thomas Reid's Inquiry into the Human Mind on the Principles of Common Sense (1764), it is a good popularization and a "rhetorical tour de force" that is worth reading because it is "an important document in the history of the Scottish common sense school of philosophy" Reid inaugurated. McDermid called the work's style "lively, polished, pure, and lucid" and credited Beattie with presenting "a systematic and accessible defense of a simple-sounding thesis - that philosophy cannot afford to despise the plain dictates of common sense" and a "forceful critique of Hume's racism." Though not considering Beattie an "original or profound" thinker, he considered him a more capable philosopher than his critics admitted, and endorsed Stewart's view of the work. He noted that Beattie, unlike Reid, tended to "denounce and vilify" his opponents and that his work was "hard-hitting and caustic", and that it tended to reassure devout Christian readers with its ridicule of Hume's scepticism.
