= Coila (muse) =

Muse of Robert Burns

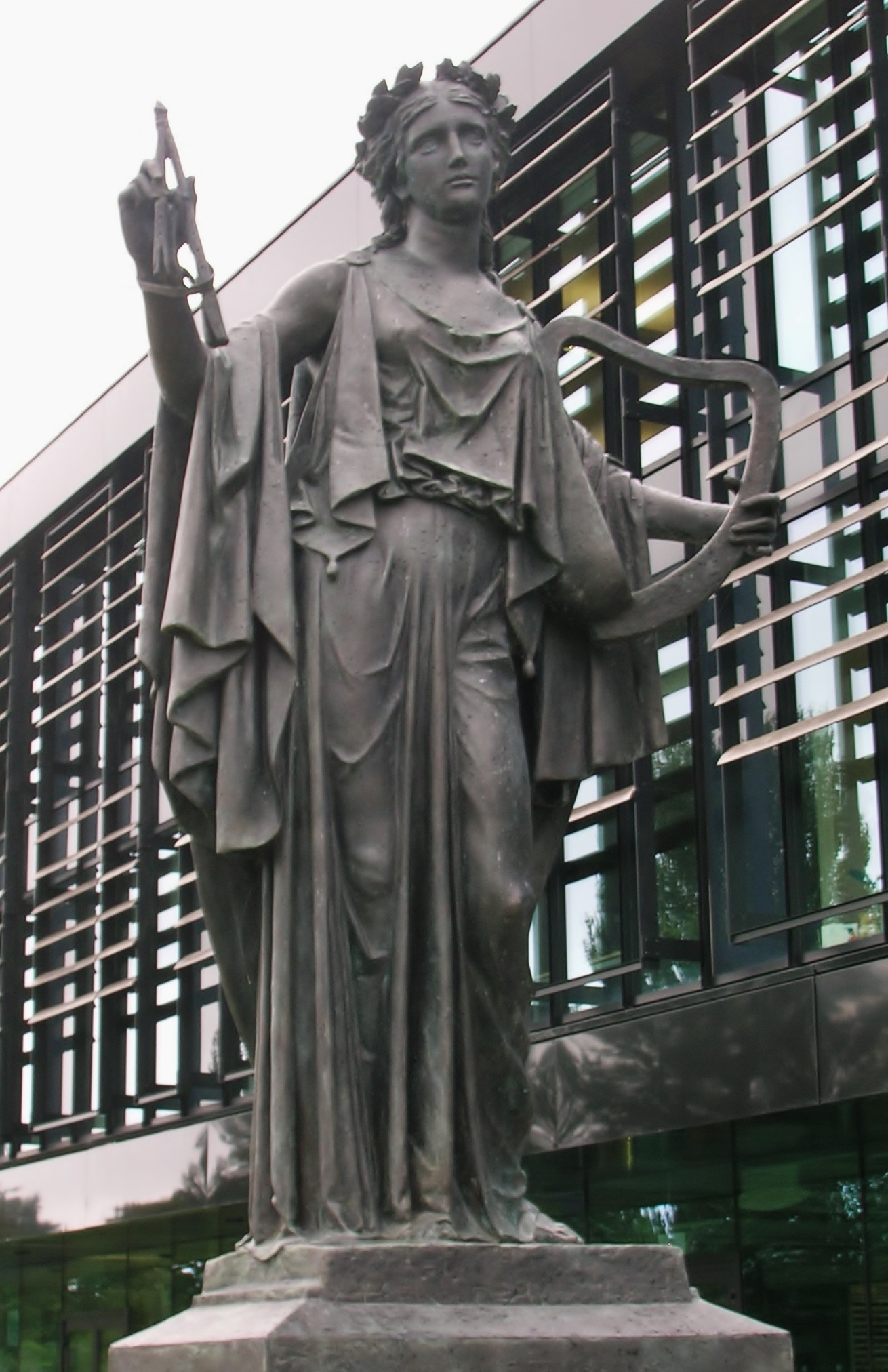
- The statue of Coila at the University of the West of Scotland, Ayr

Coila was the muse of Robert Burns who created her as a poetic device for his poem The Vision in which she provides inspiration and encouragement. The University of the West of Scotland have erected a statue to Coila in recognition of her role in providing inspiration and encouragement to others.

== Origin ==
Coila's identity is the embodiment of the lands of Kyle, Ayrshire Coila my name; and this district as mine I claim and is itself said to be derived from Coil, Coilus or Coel Hen, King of the Picts, who lived, ruled and died in the area. King Coel's grave is said to be near the Montgomerie's old estate of Coilsfield, Tarbolton.

In the poem Epistle to William Simson we find Burns' first use of the name 'Coila' as a substitute for Kyle as in: We'll sing auld Coila's plains an' fells and O' sweet are Coila's haughs and woods.

Burns informed Mrs Frances Dunlop that the idea of Coila use as the name of his poetic muse first came to him from Dr James Beattie's use, under the nom de plumee 'Oliver Oldstile', of a muse named 'Scota' in his Scots language poem of 1768 titled To Mr Alexander at Lochlee:

Ye shak your head; bat, o' my fegs,
Ye've set auld SCOTA on her legs,
Lang had she lyen wi' beffs and flegs
Bumbaz'd and dizzie,
Her fiddle wanted strings and pegs,
Waes me! poor hizzie!

== Background ==
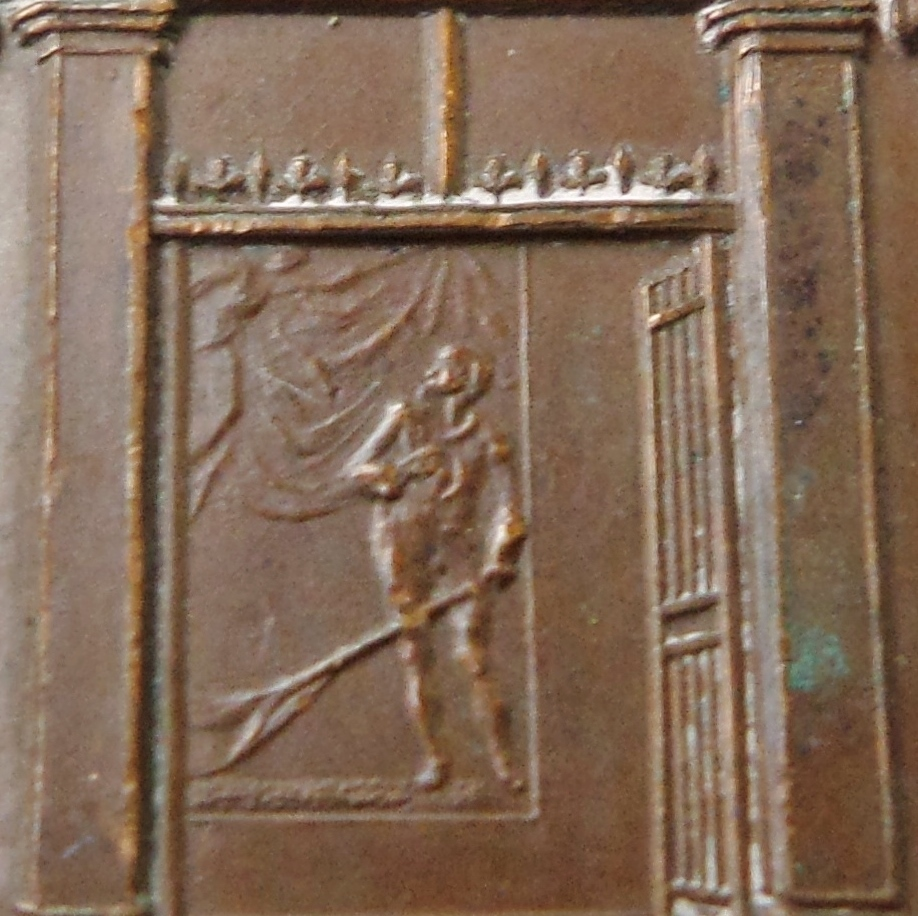
Coila standing behind Robert Burns and sheltering him with her robe. From an 1896 medallion.

In 'The Vision' the muse Coila acts as Burns' inspiration and encourages him on according to what she sees as his true nature and vocation. The farmer poet whilst living at Mossgiel near Mauchline returns to his smoky cottage after an exhausting day's labour; he is startled to see a mysterious figure enter with a 'click' of the door: a comely maiden wearing a crown of holly and a broad green mantle on which Robert sees a representation of his native Kyle.

This visitor is Coila, who explains that different spirits are assigned to poets of various degrees of ability, even the lowest. Having carefully watched his progress she describes his character and says that although he will not possess the particular powers of James Thomson, William Shenstone, or Thomas Gray, he will within his more "humble sphere" be a great success. Coila finishes by placing her holly-crown upon his head and then vanishes into the ether "like a passing thought."

In the 1786 Kilmarnock Edition of Burns' poems 'Bess' is the only possible physical peer of Coila, however by the time of the printing of the Edinburgh Edition in 1787 'Jean' has once again taken the place of Bess, a position she had held in the manuscript version prior to the incident in which their marriage lines were destroyed, according to Burns' biographer Allan Cunningham. The 'Bess' in question is likely to be Elizabeth Paton who gave birth to Burns's "Dear-bought Bess" or Elizabeth Paton Burns in May 1785.

In a song to the tune 'Roslin Castle' Burns represents Coila directly as the name of the shire :-

Farewell, old Coila's hills and dales, Her healthy moors and winding vales;

== Representation of Coila in art ==
Mrs Frances Dunlop informed Robert Burns that her artist daughter Rachel Wallace-Dunlop was undertaking a painting or sketch of Coila, prompting the poet to write from Mossgiel Farm on 7 May 1788, saying:

I am highly flattered by the news you tell me of Coila.
I may say to the fair painter who does me so much honour,
as Dr Beattie says to Ross, the poet of his muse Scota,
from which, by the by, I took the idea of Coila (tis' a poem
of Beatties in the Scottish dialect, which perhaps you have never seen).

In the sketch on New Years Day Burn's says:-

Coila's fair Rachel's care to-day.

In 1802 Rachel married Sir Robert Glasgow Esq. at Dunlop House and lived at the Montgreenan estate near Kilwinning. Mrs. Rachel Glasgow was an author with great literary taste, dying at Pau, in the Pyrenees, on 19 July 1828. Mrs. Glasgow was commemorated by the erection of a well in Kilwinning's Howgate; she had given £200 to the poor of the town.

Peter Turnerelli (1774–1839) was responsible for the fine plaster mural of Coila looking down upon the poet at the plough whilst sheltering him with her cloak that adorns the back of the Dumfries Mausoleum.

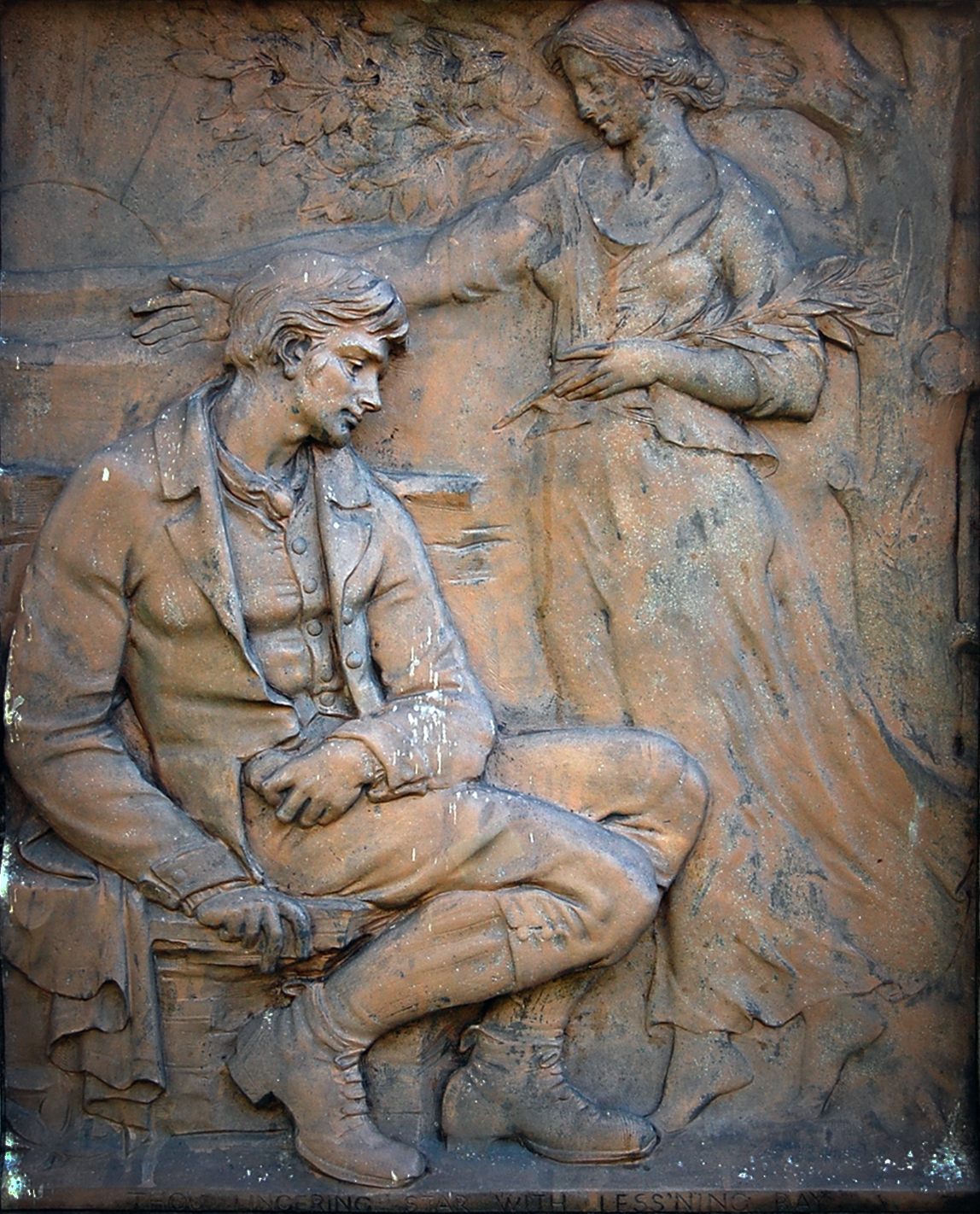
Coila with Robert Burns on the Stirling Robert Burns Statue.

In the Directors Room of the Irvine Burns Club hangs a portrait inspired by The Vision of Burns and Coila by the artist James Christie (1847–1914). In this painting a seated Burns is recovering from a hard days labouring on the farm and Coila has entered the room as a ghost-like entity, here figured hovering over his left shoulder apparently represented in the act of conversing with him. It can be seen that Coila has crowned the incipient poet with her holly crown.

The reprint of the Rev. George Gilfillan's The National Burns has two representations of 'Coila', the first by John Leighton FSA is on the title page of each of the four volumes and the second is a full plate engraving in volume 1. The title page version shows a seated Coila holding a scroll of music sitting opposite Ossian who is holding a clarsach. Coila wears a wreath of holly, a tartan skirt and a cloak bearing scenes of the Kyle countryside, including a castle tower situated next to the sea. The full plate engraving is called 'The Vision' and a standing Coila who wears a wreath, a diaphanous dress with no discernible 'illustration' and who is showing a shapely calf to Burns who is seated in front of a fire as indicated by a poker lying on the floor; she appears to be by a different artist than the seated version of the title pages.

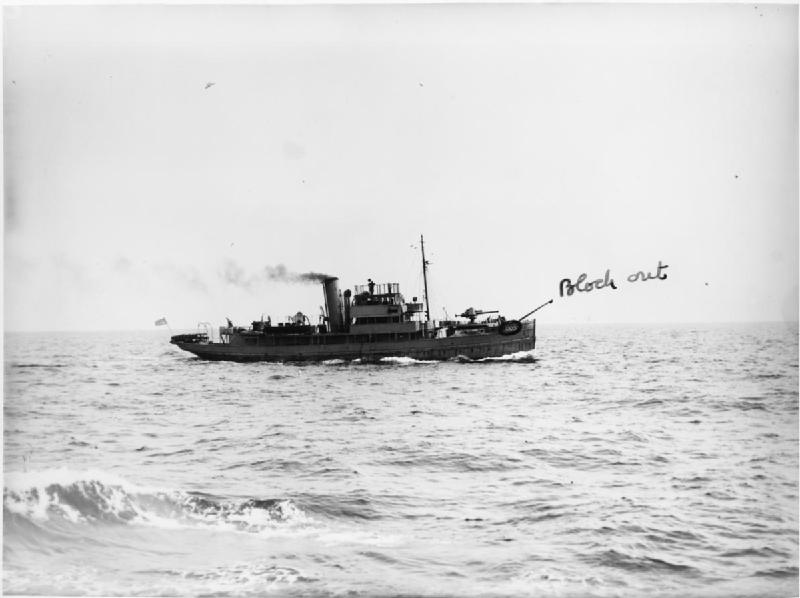
HMS Coila.

In 1914 a statue of Robert Burns by Albert Hemstock Hodge (1876-1918) was unveiled in Stirling and one of the four bronze panels on the base is that of The Poet and his Muse. The original plasterwork for this panel now hangs in the Stirling Smith Art Gallery and Museum in Dumbarton Road, Sterling.

=== Statues by Alexander Stoddart ===
In 2008 South Ayrshire Council accepted a small statue of Coila from the University of the West of Scotland (UWS) at a ceremony within the County Buildings at Ayr. The statue was commissioned by the University to mark its 2007 inauguration and Professor Seamus McDaid presented the statue by sculptor Alexander Stoddart to Provost Sloan. The statue is similar, but not identical, to the 2013 statue as described below.

On 24 July 2013 the University of the West of Scotland (UWS) unveiled a significant new work, a bronze representation of Coila that the university sees as an image that serves to inspire and encourage students in the same way that she inspired and encouraged the bard himself. The statue, again created by the Scots sculptor Alexander Stoddart, is positioned close to the River Ayr entrance of the university's Ayr Campus buildings, and is easily reached from the River Ayr walkway. The new interpretation of Coila was officially unveiled by Alice McDaid, wife of Professor Seamus McDaid, retiring Principal & Vice-Chancellor of UWS.

== Miscellaneous applications of Coila ==
In 1884 the "Coila", a timber built brigantine sank off Portland. She had been built at Sunderland in 1860 and registered at Dumfries.

In 1922 HMS Coila was launched and was classified as an armed yacht.

Coila is the name used by a professional ceilidh band and the term 'Coila Provincia' is used for the province of Kyle in Blaeu's map of 1654.

A Lake Coila exists in Australia.

In a poem dedicated to Gavin Hamilton titled 'Nature's Law – A poem' the name 'Coila' is used in the geographical sense.

Coila is also the name of a tiny hamlet just west of the Village of Cambridge, New York.

Coila is sometimes used as a personal name.

== See also ==
- Irvine Burns Club
- Kyle, Ayrshire
