= Sir Robert Glasgow =

18th-century Scottish landowner and West Indies merchant

Sir Robert Glasgow of Montgreenan
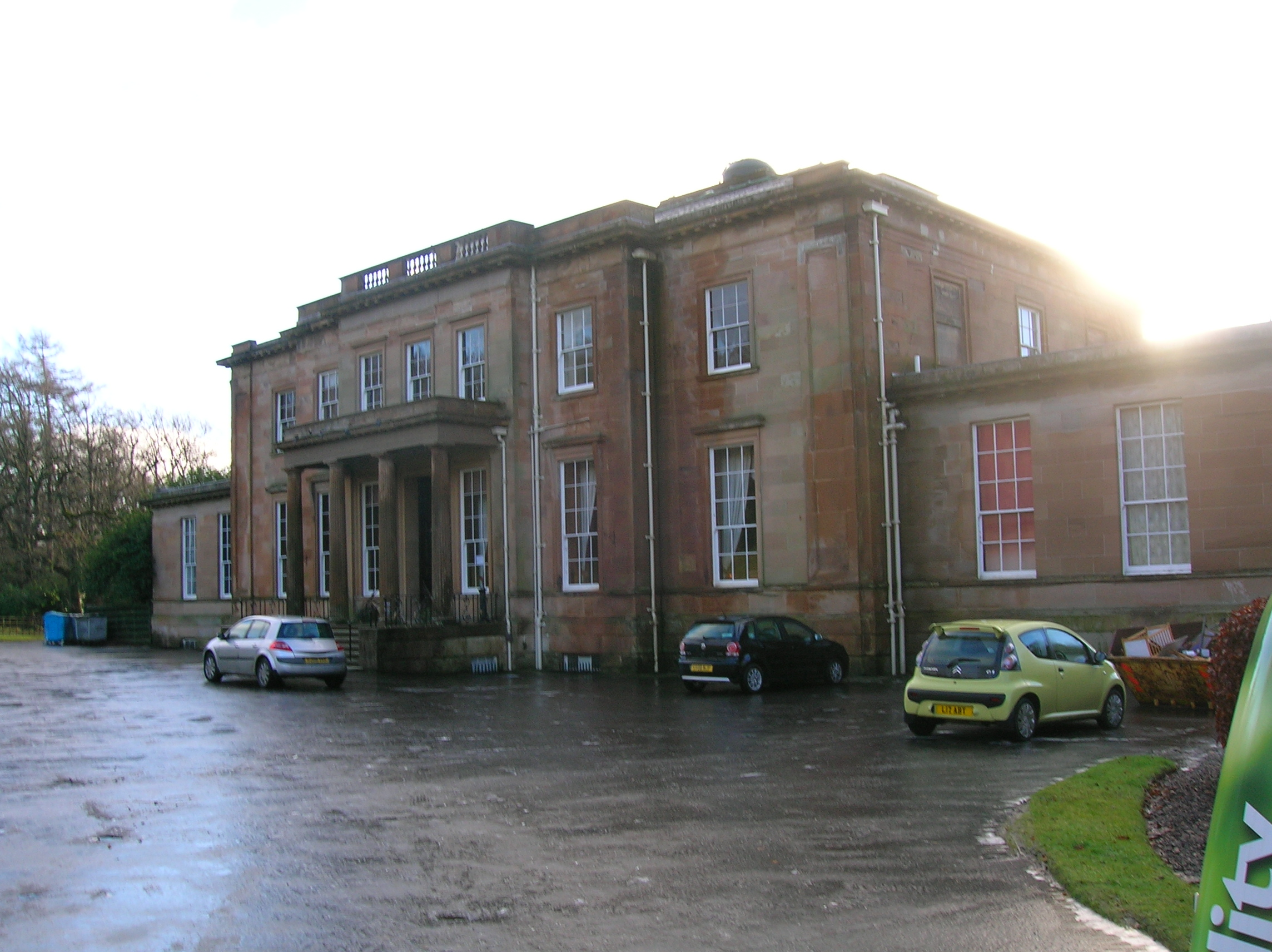
- Montgreenan House, commissioned by Robert Glasgow
- Born: 1747; Kilbirnie, Ayrshire, Scotland
- Died: 19 April 1827; Montgreenan House, Ayrshire, Scotland
- Occupations: Landowner, merchant, plantation owner
- Spouse: Rachel Dunlop
- Children: Anne Glasgow
- Relatives: Rev. John Glasgow (grandfather)

Sir Robert Glasgow of Montgreenan (1747–1827) was a Scottish landowner, West Indies merchant, and plantation owner. He was involved in the transatlantic slave economy and commissioned the Georgian mansion at Montgreenan in Ayrshire.

== Early life and family background ==
Robert Glasgow was born in 1747 in Kilbirnie, Ayrshire, the son of Dr. Robert Glasgow, a surgeon based in Kilbirnie and chamberlain to the Viscount of Garnock. His family resided at Puddockholm, a marshy estate along the River Garnock.

His grandfather, Rev. John Glasgow, M.A., served as Minister of Kilbirnie from 1688 until his death in 1721 and held the position of Provost of Irvine. He earned a Master of Arts degree from the University of Glasgow.

== Career ==
Glasgow amassed considerable wealth through his activities as a West Indies merchant. He operated a shipping company based in Saint Vincent that participated in the colonial triangle trade linking Britain, Africa, and the Caribbean.

By the early 19th century, he had purchased the lands of Fergushill in Ayrshire and inherited the Sans Souci and Montgreenan plantations in Saint Vincent. These estates were worked by enslaved labourers.

A trust deed dated 1803 bequeathed legacies to several children of African descent:

- To my reputed natural mulatto son John... £200
- To my reputed natural daughter Emilia... £500
- To Robert and James, reputed natural sons of my late brother James... £100 and £50, respectively

== Montgreenan House ==
Between 1810 and 1820, Glasgow commissioned the construction of a Georgian mansion at Montgreenan. The house, possibly influenced by architect Alexander "Greek" Thomson, later became the residence of the Viscounts Weir. It is now a Category A listed building under the care of Historic Environment Scotland.

== Enslavement and compensation ==
John Glasgow, Robert's natural son in Saint Vincent, died before September 1817. Records show he employed tradesmen and enslaved workers, including blacksmiths, coppersmiths, and house servants. In March 1817, Amelia Glasgow, his sister, registered ownership of a woman named Mary (aged 25) and four children—Adam, Eve, Peter, and James—who were likely John's partner and children. By 1822, these individuals were listed among the enslaved people at Montgreenan.

In 1838, following the Slavery Abolition Act 1833, Robert Robertson-Glasgow submitted compensation claims for enslaved individuals on both the Montgreenan and Sans Souci plantations.

== Personal life ==
Glasgow married Rachel Dunlop, daughter of Frances Wallace Dunlop and Major John Dunlop of Dunlop. They had one daughter, Anne. Although they had no other legitimate children, records confirm he fathered two natural children in Saint Vincent: John and Emilia.

== Death and legacy ==
Robert Glasgow died at Montgreenan House on 19 April 1827, leaving behind a funeral noted for its distribution of alms to 616 parish poor. His widow, Rachel, was an artist and writer who died on 19 July 1828 in Pau, France. She produced a sketch of Coila, the muse of Robert Burns, prompting Burns to write from Mossgiel Farm on 7 May 1788:

I may say to the fair painter who does me so much honour,
as Dr Beattie says to Ross, the poet of his muse Scota,
from which, by the by, I took the idea of Coila...

Rachel also supported charitable causes in Kilwinning and contributed funds to assist the local poor, leading to a commemorative well in her honor.

He bequeathed the Montgreenan and Sans Souci estates to his daughter Anne and her husband Robert Robertson of Gunsgreen House, Eyemouth. In accordance with the terms of Glasgow's will, Robertson adopted the surname Robertson-Glasgow. Their son, Robert Robertson-Glasgow (1811–1860), became Sheriff-Substitute of Renfrewshire.

== Succession ==
The estate passed successively to:

- Robert Robertson-Glasgow (1811–1860), Sheriff-Substitute of Renfrewshire
- Robert Bruce Robertson-Glasgow (died 1896), Lieutenant-Colonel, Royal Scots Fusiliers
