= Dido Elizabeth Belle and Lady Elizabeth Murray =

Painting by David Martin

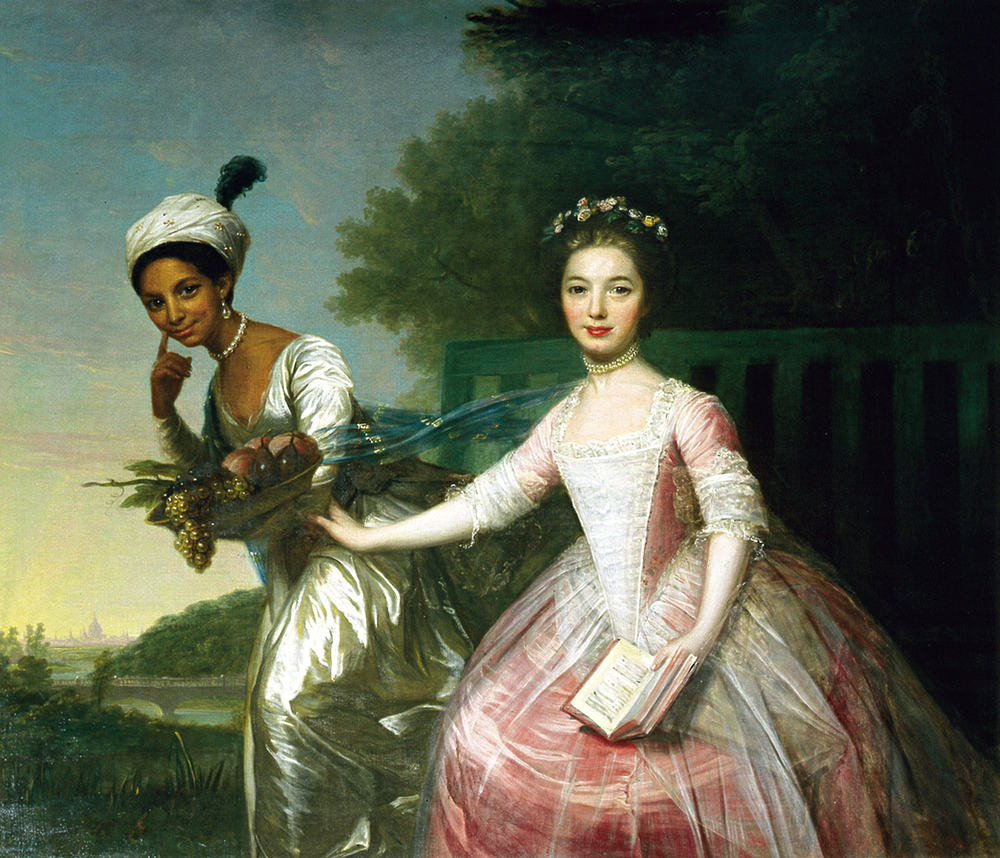
- Artist: David Martin
- Year: 1778
- Type: Oil on canvas, portrait painting
- Location: Scone Palace, Scone

Dido Elizabeth Belle and Lady Elizabeth Murray is a 1778 portrait painting by the British artist David Martin. It features a double portrait of the cousins Dido Elizabeth Belle and Lady Elizabeth Murray. Dido was the great niece of Lord Chief Justice Lord Mansfield who made notable rulings limiting the practice of slavery and the slave trade, notably Somersett's Case and the Zong trial. The painting is now in the collection of Scone Palace near Perth while a reproduction exists at Kenwood House in Highgate, where Dido and Elizabeth lived with Lord Mansfield.

The 2013 film Belle drew inspiration from the painting.

== Description and history ==
The family commissioned a painting of Dido and Elizabeth. Completed in 1779, it was formerly attributed to Johan Zoffany, but, following research by the BBC TV programme Fake or Fortune?, it has now been verified by the Scottish National Gallery as a painting of the Scottish portraitist David Martin in the Zoffany style. The family archivist stated that the painting was put in storage at Kenwood House just three years after Lord Mansfield's death and stayed there until the 1920s, when the family sold Kenwood House and moved their belongings to Scone Palace in Perth, Scotland.

According to Historic England, the painting is "unique in British art of the 18th century in depicting a black woman and a white woman as near equals". It shows Dido alongside and slightly behind her cousin Elizabeth, carrying exotic fruit and wearing a turban with a large ostrich feather. The painting is owned by the present Earl of Mansfield and housed at Scone Palace. In 2007, it was exhibited in Kenwood House as part of an exposition marking the bicentenary prior to the Abolition of the Slave Trade Act, together with more information about Belle.

The painting is discussed by English Heritage in the following way:

The portrait of the two women is highly unusual in 18th-century British art for showing a black woman as the equal of her white companion, rather than as a servant or slave. [...] The basket of tropical fruit she carries and the turban with expensive feather that she wears suggest an exotic difference from her more conventionally styled white cousin, who is sitting reading a book.

— English Heritage

== See also ==
- Portrait of Lord Mansfield, 1783 painting by John Singleton Copley

== Bibliography ==
- Brathwaite, Peter. Rediscovering Black Portraiture. Getty Publications, 2023.
- Oldham, James. English Common Law in the Age of Mansfield. University of North Carolina Press, 2005.
- Peels, Rik. Ignorance: A Philosophical Study. Oxford University Press, 2023.
