= Alexander Bower =

Scottish biographer

Alexander Bower (fl. 1804–1830) was a biographer from Scotland.

Bower began as a teacher in Edinburgh, then acted as assistant-librarian in the university of Edinburgh. He died suddenly about 1830–1.

He published several works between 1804 and 1830:

- An Account of the Life of James Beattie, LL.D., 1804, 8vo., besides his subject, James Beattie, are occasional notes on contemporary literature and literary figures in Scotland.
- The Life of Luther, with an account of the early progress of the Reformation, 1813, 8vo.
- The History of the University of Edinburgh, chiefly compiled from original Papers and Records never before published, vols. i. ii., 1817, vol. iii. 1830, 8vo. noted as a biographical source for people associated with the university, but other details are lacking in value.
- The Edinburgh Students' Guide, or an Account of the Classes of the University, 1822.
