= James Beattie (poet) =

Scottish poet, moralist and philosopher (1735–1803)

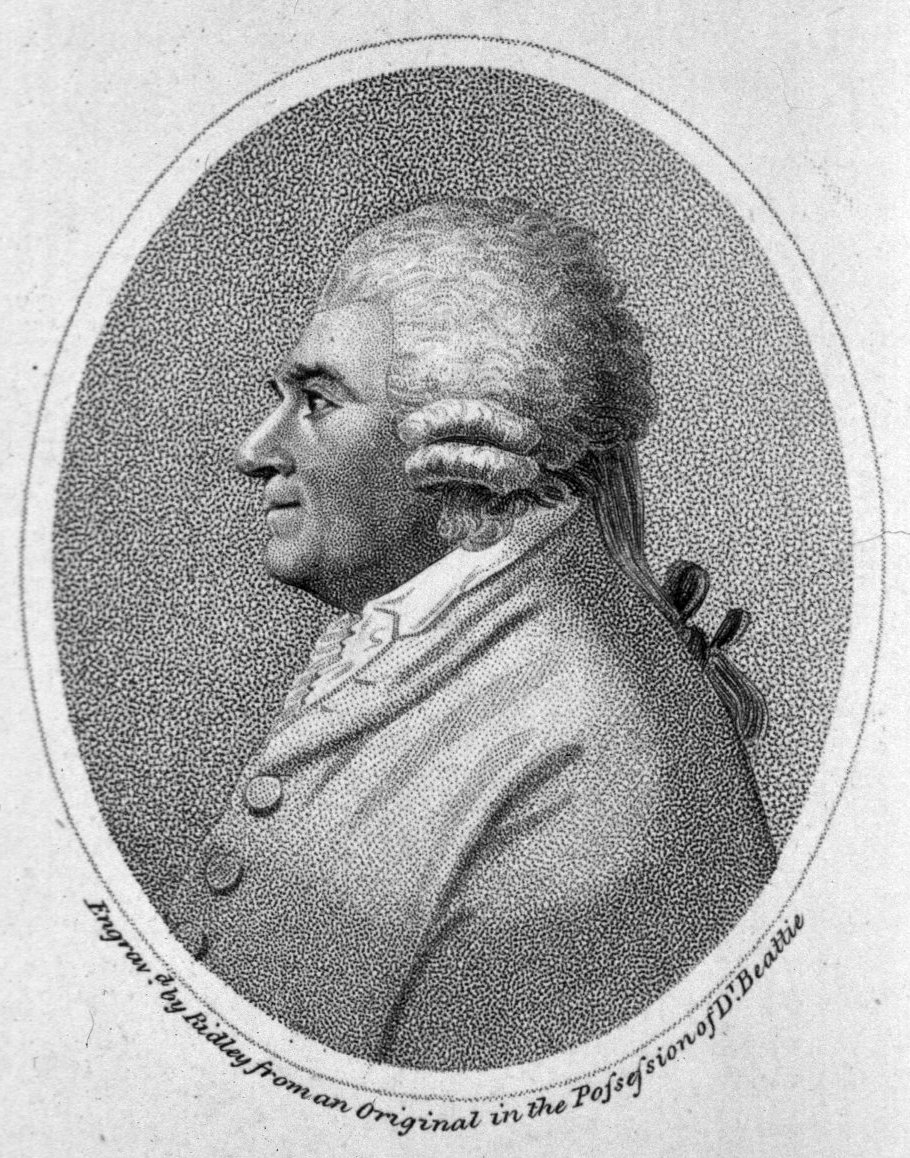
- Born: 25 October 1735; Laurencekirk, Kincardineshire, Scotland
- Died: 18 August 1803 (aged 67); Aberdeen, Scotland
- Occupations: Scholar, poet

Academic background
- Education: Marischal College

Academic work
- School or tradition: Scottish common sense realism Scottish Enlightenment
- Institutions: Marischal College

James Beattie (/ˈbiːti/; 25 October 1735 – 18 August 1803) was a Scottish poet, moralist, and philosopher.

== Career ==
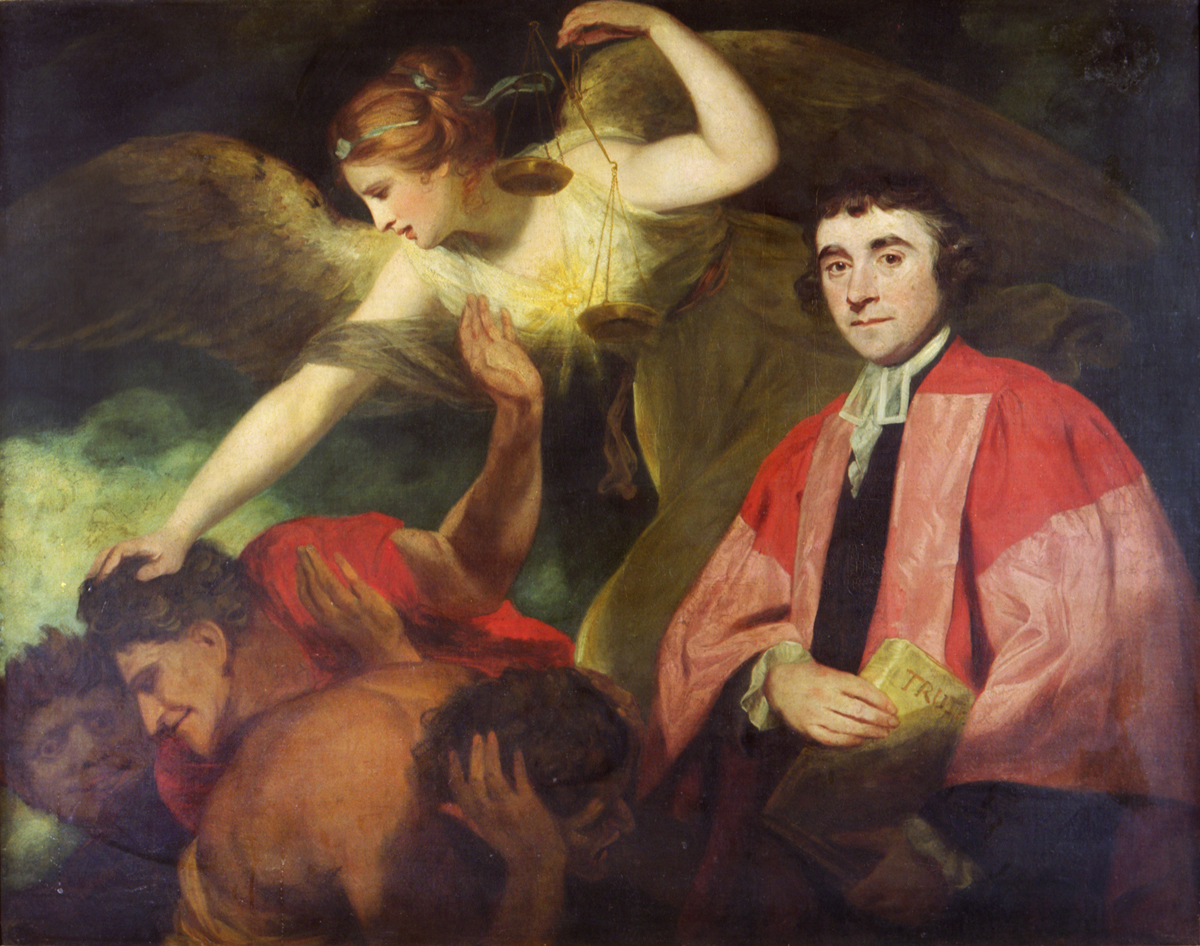
Beattie, by Sir Joshua Reynolds

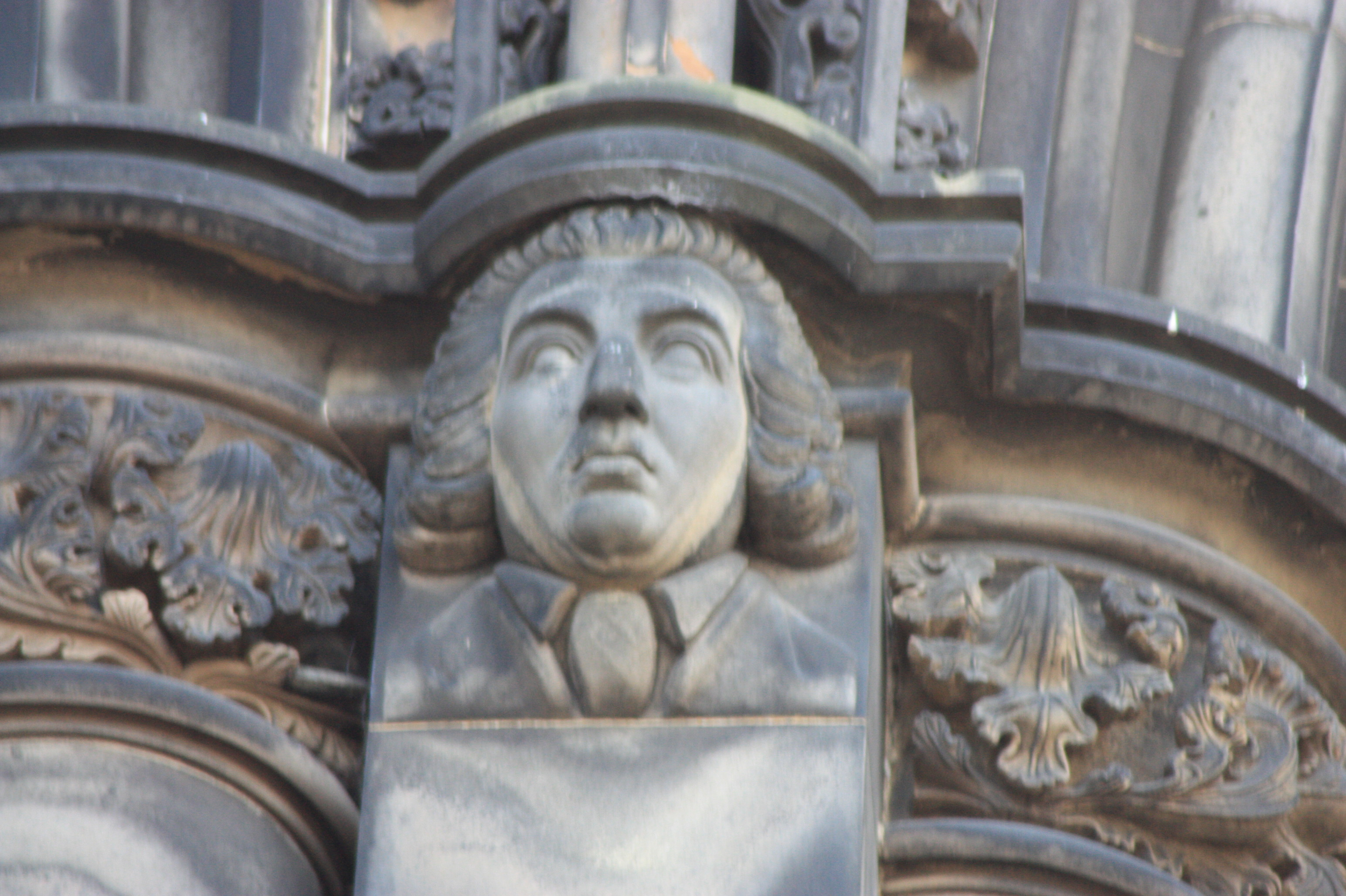
The poet James Beattie as depicted on the Scott Monument

He became the schoolmaster of the parish of Fordoun in 1753. He took the position of usher at the grammar school of Aberdeen in 1758.

In 1760, he was, to his surprise, appointed Professor of Moral Philosophy at Marischal College (later part of Aberdeen University) as a result of the influence exerted by his close friend, Robert Arbuthnot of Haddo. In the following year, he published a volume of poems, The Judgment of Paris (1765), which attracted attention. But the two works that brought him most fame were An Essay on the Nature and Immutability of Truth, and his poem of The Minstrel. The Essay, intended as an answer to David Hume, had great immediate success, and led to an introduction to the King, a pension of £200, and the degree of LL.D. from Oxford. The first book of The Minstrel was published in 1771 and the second in 1774, and constitutes his true title to remembrance, winning him the praise of Samuel Johnson. It contains much beautiful descriptive writing.

Beattie was prominent in arguing against the institution of slavery, notably in his Essay on the Nature and Immutability of Truth (1770), and in Elements of Moral Science (1790–93), where he used the case of Dido Belle to argue the mental capacity of black people.

Beattie was an amateur cellist and member of the Aberdeen Musical Society. He considered questions of music philosophy in his essay On Poetry and Music (written 1762, published 1776), which was republished several times and translated into French in 1798. His poem "The Hermit" was set to music by Tommaso Giordani (1778).

Beattie co-founded the Royal Society of Edinburgh in 1783. He was elected to the American Philosophical Society in 1786.

== Personal life ==
James Beattie was born the youngest of six children of a shopkeeper and small farmer at Laurencekirk in the Mearns, and educated at Marischal, graduating in 1753.

Beattie underwent much domestic sorrow in his later years, which broke down his own health and spirits. His wife, Mary née Dunn, whom he had married in 1767, went mad and was committed to a Musselburgh asylum. His two promising sons both died: James Hay in 1790 aged 22 from "nervous atrophy", and Montagu in 1796, a 'promising poet' aged 18 after a short illness.

He relinquished his duties at Marischal in 1797. That year he became afflicted with rheumatism, and in 1799 he had a stroke of palsy. He died in Aberdeen in 1803 and is buried there in St Nicholas' Churchyard.

His niece, Margaret Valentine, married Reverend Professor George Glennie FRSE.

== Recognition ==
Beattie is today remembered primarily for his poetry and for his staunch opposition to slavery. His philosophical work, at least in such areas as epistemology and metaphysics, has generally been assessed very negatively in the time since his death. Immanuel Kant regarded him in that way, stating that his misunderstanding of most of David Hume's work was "positively painful". Philosopher John Immerwahr states that among contemporary scholars, Beattie is regarded as "a superficial thinker who is primarily known because he was the source for some of Kant's knowledge of Hume".

A biographical sketch, An Account of the Life of James Beattie, LL.D., was published in 1804 by Alexander Bower.

The poet Robert Burns informed Mrs Frances Dunlop in a letter that the idea of using Coila as the name of his poetic muse first came to him from Beattie's use of a muse named 'Scota' in his Scots language poem of 1768 titled To Mr Alexander at Lochlee.

Beattie is one of the sixteen Scottish poets and writers depicted on the Scott Monument on Princes Street in Edinburgh. He appears on the left side of the east face.

== Works ==
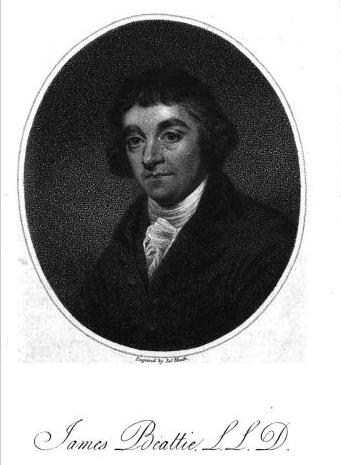
Portrait of James Beattie by James Heath

- Original Poems and Translations (1760)
- The Judgement of Paris (1765)
- Poems on Several Subjects (1766)
- An Essay on the Nature and Immutability of Truth (1770)
- The Minstrel; or, The Progress of Genius (two volumes, 1771 and 1774)
- Essays, on the nature and immutability of truth in opposition to sophistry and scepticism. On poetry and music as they affect the mind. On laughter and ludicrous composition. On the utility of classical learning (1776)
- Essays on Poetry (1778)
- Scoticisms, Arranged in Alphabetical Order, Designed to Correct Improprieties of Speech and Writing (1779)
- Poems on several occasions (1780)
- Dissertations Moral and Critical (1783)
- The Evidence of the Christian Religion Briefly and Plainly Stated (two volumes, 1786)
- The theory of language. Part I. Of the origin and general nature of speech. Part II. Of universal grammar (1788)
- Elements of Moral Science (two volumes, 1790–1793) Vol 1 Vol 2
- The Poetical Works of James Beattie (1831), edited by A. Dyce
- The poetical works of Beattie, Blair, and Falconer (1868), edited by Charles Cowden Clarke
- James Beattie's Day-Book, 1773–1778 (1948), edited by R. S. Walker
- James Beattie's Diary (1948), edited by R. S. Walker

== See also ==
- List of abolitionist forerunners
