= Portrait of Benjamin Franklin =

Painting by David Martin

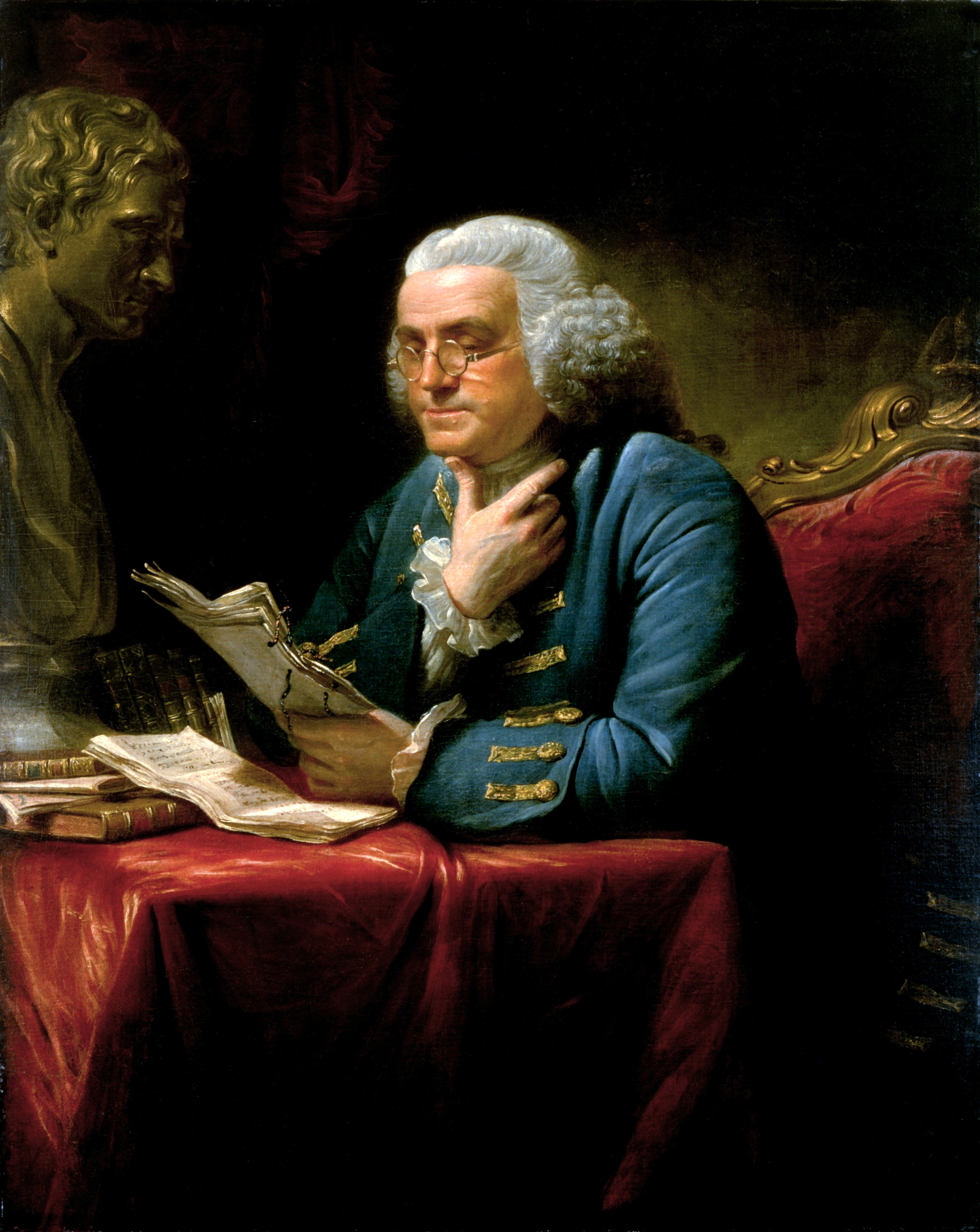
- Artist: David Martin
- Year: 1767
- Type: Oil on canvas, portrait
- Dimensions: 127.2 cm × 101.4 cm (50.1 in × 39.9 in)
- Location: White House; Washington D.C.

Portrait of Benjamin Franklin is a 1767 portrait painting by the Scottish artist David Martin of the American politician and inventor Benjamin Franklin. It was painted during his lengthy residence in London when he was acting as colonial agent for Pennsylvania, Georgia, New Jersey, and Massachusetts. The work was commissioned by the Edinburgh merchant Robert Alexander, a friend of Franklin. He is shown seated next to a bust of the scientist Isaac Newton.

The painting was displayed at the Exhibition of 1767 held by the Society of Artists held at Spring Gardens. Today it is part of the collection of the White House.

== Bibliography ==
- Goodwin, George. Benjamin Franklin in London: The British Life of America's Founding Father. Yale University Press, 2016.
- Keynes, Milo. The Iconography of Sir Isaac Newton to 1800. Boydell Press, 2005.
- Morgan, David T. The Devious Dr. Franklin, Colonial Agent: Benjamin Franklin's Years in London. Mercer University Press, 1999.
