= David Martin (artist) =

Scottish painter and engraver (1737–1797)

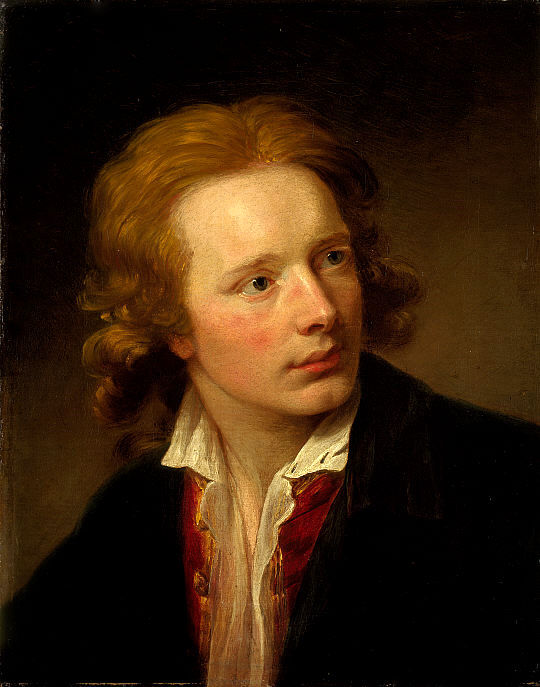
- Self-portrait, 1760
- Born: 1 April 1737; Anstruther, Scotland
- Died: 30 December 1797 (aged 60); Edinburgh, Scotland
- Education: Allan Ramsay; St Martin's Lane Academy
- Known for: Portrait painting

David Martin (1 April 1737 – 30 December 1797) was a Scottish painter and engraver. Born in Fife, he studied in Italy and England, before gaining a reputation as a portrait painter.

== Early life ==
Born in Anstruther Easter, Scotland, he was the first of the five children of John Martin (1699/1700–1772), Anstruther Easter's parish schoolmaster, and his second wife, Mary Boyack (?1702–1783).

== Painting career ==
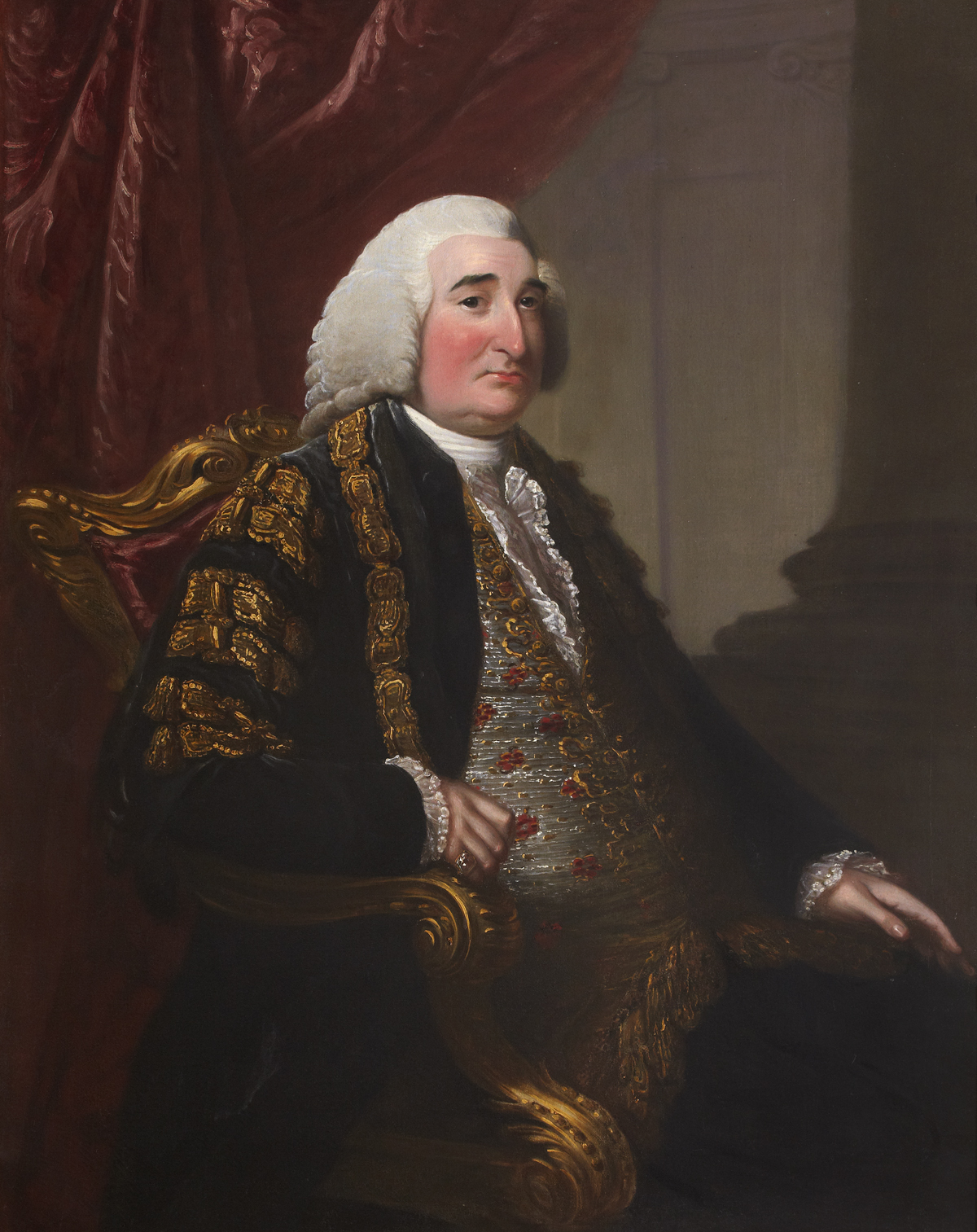
Thomas Hay 9th Earl of Kinnoull

Martin accompanied his art teacher, the portrait painter Allan Ramsay, on his tour of Italy in 1756–7, and after returning became a student at the St Martin's Lane Academy in London. There he gained premiums for life drawing in each year from 1759 to 1761. He also joined Ramsay's studio in the 1760s as its principal draughtsman, helping to produce many of the coronation portraits of George III and Queen Charlotte.

Martin had his own studio by 1770, by which time he had also produced his first self-portrait (now in the National Gallery of Scotland). It shows him with a clear fair skin, wavy ginger hair, aquiline nose and small red lips. Martin painted more than 300 portraits in his lifetime. One of the earliest independent ones is that of Benjamin Franklin (now in the White House, Washington, DC), painted in 1767. Martin's most influential works depict Scottish Enlightenment figures like the chemist Joseph Black (1787, Scottish National Portrait Gallery) and the philosopher David Hume (1770, now in a private collection), and noblewomen such as the Honourable Barbara Gray (1787). His Dictionary of National Biography entry states: "He portrayed his sitters with integrity in an honest natural style, thereby consolidating a recognizably Scottish tradition of portraiture." Martin exhibited at the Incorporated Society of Artists from 1765 to 1777 (being elected its treasurer, vice-president, and president between 1772 and 1777), at the Free Society of Artists in 1767 and at the Royal Academy in 1779 and 1790. He is listed in 1766 as a member of the Society for the Encouragement of the Arts, Manufactures and Commerce, as "History Painter, living in Soho Square".

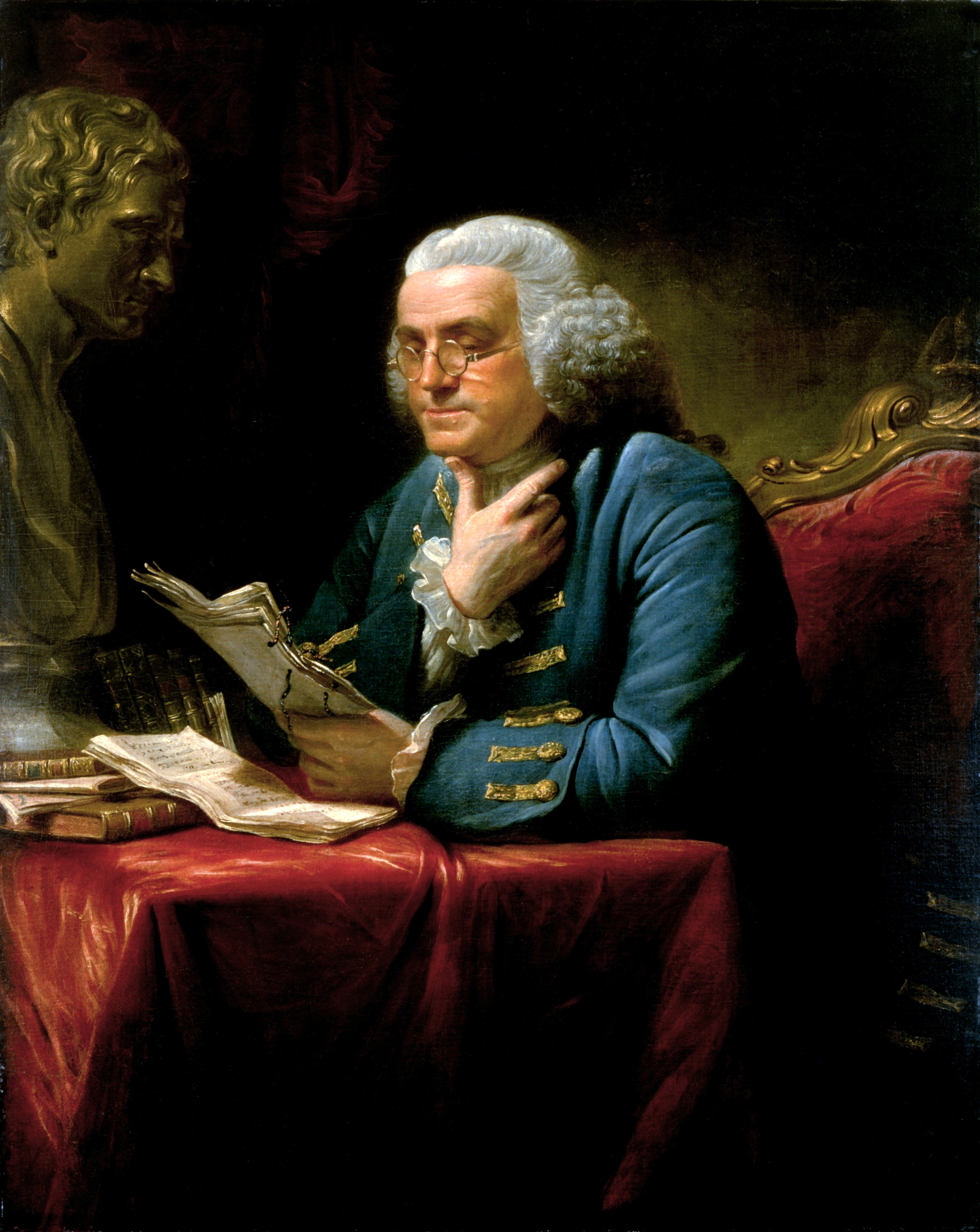
Portrait of Benjamin Franklin, 1767 A portrait now in the White House

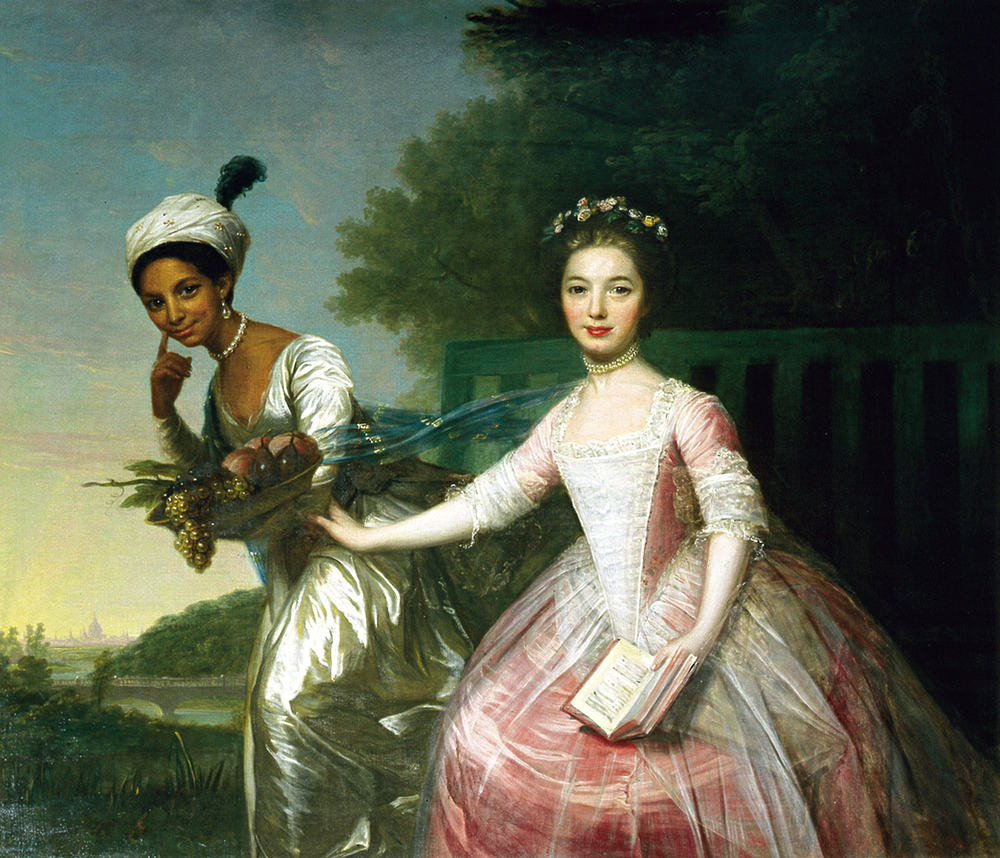
Dido Elizabeth Belle and Lady Elizabeth Murray, 1778. Dido Elizabeth Belle and her cousin Elizabeth Murray at Kenwood, London

As well as producing his own paintings, Martin copied them himself in highly-praised mezzotints, such as those of Lady Frances Manners (1772), impressions of which may be seen in the British Museum, under catalogue entries 1887 0406 87 and 1887 0406 142. He also executed line engravings, such as that of William Murray, 1st Earl of Mansfield (an impression of which is held in the library of Lincoln's Inn), as well as producing engravings of landscapes.

In 1780, Martin returned to Edinburgh (although not selling his home in High Street, Dartford, until 1782), a move signalled by his admittance to the Royal Company of Archers and a rare full-length portrait he painted of its president, Sir James Pringle of Stichill (1791–4). In 1785, Martin was appointed principal painter in Scotland to the Prince of Wales.

Martin died in 1797 at his home, 4 St James Square, Edinburgh, and was buried on 3 January 1798, in the graveyard at South Leith Parish Church. In 1799, his home and studio contents sold at an auction that took 21 days.

In 2018, as a result of research done by the BBC-TV programme Fake or Fortune?, Martin was verified as the artist who painted the portrait of Dido Elizabeth Belle and her cousin Elizabeth, a work that had previously been attributed to Johan Zoffany.

== Family ==
On 20 July 1771, Martin married Ann Hill (1743–1775), but all three of their children died in infancy.
