= Zong =

Zong may refer to:

- Zong (surname), including a list of people with the name
- Zong (payments provider), American micropayments provider
- Zong (mobile network), mobile data network provider in Pakistan
- Zong!, a 2008 book-length poem by M. NourbeSe Philip
- Zong massacre, a 1781 slave massacre on the British slave ship Zong
- Zongzi, or zong, a traditional Chinese rice dish

== See also ==
- Zhuang (surname)
- Dzong architecture, a type of fortified monastery architecture in Bhutan and Tibet
- Crystals of Zong, maze-chase game for the Commodore 64
- Dai Zong, a fictional character in Water Margin, a classic Chinese novel
- Zing Zong, a 1991 soukous album by Kanda Bongo Man
