= Simon Schama's Power of Art =

BBC television series presented by Simon Schama

- Genre: Art History
- Created by: Simon Schama
- Written by: Simon Schama
- Directed by: Clare Beavan; Steve Condie; Carl Hindmarch; David Belton; James Runcie
- Presented by: Simon Schama
- Narrated by: Simon Schama
- Original language: English
- No. of seasons: 1
- No. of episodes: 8

Production
- Executive producer: Basil Comely
- Producers: Clare Beavan; Steve Condie; Carl Hindmarch; David Belton; James Runcie; Silvia Sacco; Simon Schama

Simon Schama's Power of Art is an eight-part BBC TV mini-series examining the works of eight artists, the context surrounding one of their works and the message they intended to convey with these. It was written, created, narrated, and presented by Simon Schama. The series was first broadcast in October 2006 on BBC2, and was aired in multiple countries from 2006 to 2008, even being translated to Persian and Italian. The series is presented in chronological order with the oldest artists being the earliest episodes and the most recent artists being the last episodes. The series looks at the following artists and works:

1. Caravaggio – David with the Head of Goliath (c. 1610)
2. Bernini – Ecstasy of Saint Teresa (1657)
3. Rembrandt – The Conspiracy of Claudius Civilis (1662)
4. David – The Death of Marat (1793)
5. Turner – The Slave Ship (1840)
6. Van Gogh – Wheatfield with Crows (1890)
7. Picasso – Guernica (1937)
8. Rothko – Black on Maroon (1958)

== Episodes ==
=== 1. Caravaggio (David with the Head of Goliath) ===
The host looked at what made Caravaggio paint this work and the message Caravaggio intended to show in his work. The episode reveals to viewers that Caravaggio was charged with murder and became a criminal, with Schama suggesting that this led to the darker themes found in his work. He details that the artwork's intended message was as a plea for forgiveness from the Pope to remove the death by decapitation sentencing that Caravaggio had received following the murder of Ranuccio Tomassoni in 1606.

=== 2. Bernini (Ecstasy of St Theresa) ===
The work was constructed in Santa Maria della Vittoria, Rome over a five-year period between 1647 and 1652, depicting Teresa of Àvila. The narrator describes that he sought to portray the Saint's overpowering joy or ecstasy in her servitude to God. The influence behind such a work came as a result of Bernini's passion and devout belief in Christianity. This religious belief saw him place the work at the back of the chapel and construct a hidden window above where rays of sunlight dawned on the marble sculpture so as to give it a heavenly, religious touch.

=== 3. Rembrandt (The Conspiracy of Claudius Civilius) ===
Schama outlines that the painting was commissioned by the Amsterdam City Council for the new Town Hall (Cavalli-Björkman, Görel, and Margaretha Rossholm-Lagerlöf 135–136). It was originally appointed to Govert Flinck who died before the project was undertaken. The project was then divided up, with Rembrandt being commissioned to paint a scene from the rebellion of the Batavians (former inhabitants of Holland) against the Romans. The host notes, the work was painted after the death of his wife and three of his children, describing that the etched, darker brushwork was influenced by this. This style was also common in the Baroque period and Rembrandt's style as a whole.

=== 4. David (Death of Marat) ===
The episode analyses how the artwork was as a tribute to his late friend and French Revolution leader, Jean-Paul Marat, who had been murdered by Charlotte Corday. The stylistic features of the work incorporated the history of the Roman and Greek empires. This was to symbolise to the people of the French Revolution that a future similar to these empires lay in front of them. While also forewarning what a misuse of freedom could lead to (death of their leader).

=== 5. Turner (The Slave Ship) ===
Schama outlines the inspiration behind such a painting. Turner was compelled to paint the work after reading The History and Abolition of the Slave Trade by Thomas Clarkson, he learned of the Zong massacre in 1781, when more than 130 slaves were ordered to be thrown overboard in order to collect insurance payments. The episode examines the development of Turner from a landscape painter to a symbolic expressionist painter, connecting the original landscape and transforming it into a more abstract piece that links together the natural environment. Specifically, it is noted how he transformed the natural environment using water colours, so that, "The storm is partially lulled, and the torn and streaming rain clouds are moving in scarlet lines to lose themselves in the hollow of the night."

=== 6. Van Gogh (Wheatfield with Crows) ===
This work was one of Vincent van Gogh's final works and was completed in July 1890, before he died on 29 July 1890. The episode details the effect Van Gogh's lack of wealth had on his work, where this combined with his undiagnosed epilepsy, saw him end up in a mental asylum. It was here that Van Gogh was inspired to, "Sadness, extreme loneliness," while also wanting to show what he considered, "Healthy and fortifying about the countryside." Schama examines the subject matter of the work, where, "The menacing sky, the crows and the dead-end path are said to refer to the end of his life approaching."

=== 7. Picasso (Guernica) ===
Schama outlines how the artwork was crafted in response to the bombing of a defenceless city, Guernica, by Nazi planes during the Spanish Civil War. The work is one of Picasso's cubist works, where its subject matter revolved around, "The most notorious bombing of the century." The artwork spans 7.77m wide and 3.49 high. The episode outlines that the message intended from the artwork was to exemplify the horrors and damages of war and act as an anti-war symbol. And that the size of the artwork aids to engulf the majority of the viewer's field of vision and exemplify this message.

=== 8. Rothko (Black on Maroon) ===
This early Rothko work was completed in order to fulfil a commission for the Four Seasons in New York. Rothko withheld the work from installation at the restaurant, as he did not want his work as a background to the wealthy. Schama outlines this and the inspirations surrounding Rothko and this work, specifically outlining his upbringing as a Russian emigrant. Rothko initially gained inspiration as an abstract expressionist. Heavily influenced by philosophy and mythology, these two influences culminated in Rothko using colour to form a different medium, liberating colour from the objects, so that objects no longer have colour, but the painting as a whole, does.

== Production ==
Filming for the Power of Art by Simon Schama started in October 2004. The show itself was released in 2006. Schama constructed the series shortly after his previous work, History of Britain. The series producer was Clare Beavan, the executive producer was Basil Comely and the show was backed by the BBC. The series is produced in chronological order from Caravaggio (David with the Head of Goliath, 1610) as the first episode, to Rothko (Black on Maroon, 1958) as the last artist. Schama used a variety of cinematic techniques to impress upon the viewer the context surrounding the artist, to explain artistic work through language. The host aimed to put viewers into the situations that these artists were facing at the time of painting their works. When shooting the episodes, to achieve this aim Schama required that special cameras were used to allow exclusive angles of the artworks to be captured. This was especially the case for the Bernini episode where a jib camera was necessary to, "Feel Bernini making the sculpture, modelling the smile of the angel." (9:25)

In some episodes, the series incorporated actors to re-enact or re-envision the moments or context that surrounded the artist when painting the selected artwork. In these re-enactment scenes Paul Popplewell played Caravaggio, Van Gogh was performed by Andy Serkis and Mark Rothko played by Allan Corduner.

=== Idea for the show ===
Schama was asked to create the series after talks with BBC executives." (5:16-7:01) The premise or the intended aim of the series was to pull viewers into the surroundings and context of the artist when they were painting their artwork. The aim of the series is described by Schama numerous times in a self-interview regarding the series. First, "Getting you (the viewer) out of the art gallery, out of the harsh world of the acoustic, where a guy tells you how long to stand in front of a painting and when to move on. And plunk you back down into Rome in the 17th century, or Amsterdam or the Spanish Civil War." (4:10) Further he states that he aimed to make viewers feel the very situations of the painting, "To make the hair stand on the back of your neck, at this moment of panic or crisis, or drama, drama of the creative moment," (4:30) explaining, "If it's going to be done, especially if I'm going to do it, the viewer has to suspend disbelief, that's what we do in writing history." (5:53) Schama finally surmises the inspiration for creating the show. "What we're trying to do in this series is to make you all that excited about paintings you may know and may want to look at again, sculptures you may know and want to look at again…We want to make this art as real to you as they were when the paint was still wet or before the marble was polished." (19:38)

In the self-interview, Schama explains the reason for the structure of the show (why only one artwork was examined). "We (Schama and the team creating the show) knew for this sense of art as a drama to work… we would concentrate on one moment of trouble in the artist's career, but also one particular work of art. And then we'd loop back from that work of art to explain how the artist got to that moment of trouble. And that freed us completely from having to do a program which covered every single greatest hit." (10:55)

== Distribution ==
The series was distributed firstly through the BBC mediums. It was broadcast on BBC2 in October 2006. It can now be bought, and clips of the series can be viewed on the BBC streaming service. The series was aired in Poland on TVP2 in February and March 2008. It aired in September 2008 in; the US (on PBS), Canada (on TVOntario), Australia (on ABC1), Asia-Pacific (on Australia Network), New Zealand (on TV ONE) and in Greece (ET1). The series was translated into Persian and Italian, airing on BBC Persia in Iran and Sky Italia in Italy.

== Release and reception ==
The series was generally well received. In terms of critical reception, John McDonald of the Sydney Morning Herald describes Schama as, "Like a Hollywood director, he has the ability to turn the most humdrum aspects of an artist's biography into high adventure."
New York Times writer, Alessandra Stanley (in 2007, right as the documentary was airing) commended Schama himself stating, "Power of Art, succeeds not because of the power of the chosen masterpieces but because Mr. Schama masterfully weaves engaging mysteries around each artwork."
John Leonard of New York Magazine/Vulture (top critic on Rotten Tomatoes) states that, "This is not a substitute for art history; it is instead a series of seminars with a mind equal parts cultivated, enthusiastic, and idiosyncratic: his very own Bernini fountain."
Christopher Smith of Bangor Daily News (Maine) posted to Rotten Tomatoes that, "If there's a criticism of the set, it's of Schama himself, who favours a heavy pen." Smith also states, "Still, sift through the wordplay and the padding, and what you find is a mind bright with insight."
In terms of numerical reviews, IMDb (with a total number of ratings of 994) rated the series 8.6 out of 10. Rotten Tomatoes gave the series a rating of 93% (with a total number of ratings of 40).

== Awards ==
The series was nominated and won a number of awards. They are in the table below:

Award	Year	Category	Recipient(s)	Result
BAFTA TV Awards	2007	Best Photography Factual	Tim Cragg	Won
BAFTA TV Awards	2007	Huw Wheldon Award for Specialist Factual	Clare Beavan, Simon Schama, Basil Comely and Mark Harrison	Nominated
Broadcasting Press Guild Awards	2007	Best Documentary/Factual Series	BBC	Nominated
International Emmy Awards	2007	Arts Programming	UK	Won
International Emmy Awards	2007	Arts Programming	Clare Beavan and the BBC	Won
Royal Television Society Awards	2007	Arts	BBC	Nominated
The Grierson Trust British Documentary Award	2007	Best Documentary on the Arts	Clare Beavan and the BBC	Nominated

== DVD and book releases ==
Power of Art was published in book form by BBC Books in 2006 and released on DVD in June 2007.
