= Olesya Hudyma =

Ukrainian artist (born 1980)

- Born: 10 May 1980 (age 45); Ternopil, Ukrainian SSR, Soviet Union
- Education: Lviv University
- Known for: Painting
- Website: olesyahudyma.com

Olesya Hudyma (born 10 May 1980), also known as Olesya Petrivna Hudyma, is a contemporary Ukrainian painter. She has been a member of the National Union of Journalists of Ukraine since 2009.

In 2022, she received the All-Ukrainian Literary and Artistic Prize, named after Bohdan and Levko Lepky.

== Early life and education ==
Olesya Hudyma was born on 10 May 1980 in Ternopil, Ukraine. She graduated with a degree in journalism from Lviv University and went on to work as a journalist for print media in Ternopil.

In 2007, she left journalism to become a full-time painter.

== Career ==
Hudyma's works have included several series, most notably "Dreams", "Steps", "Angels of Peace for Ukraine", "Ukrainian Madonna", and "Flowers". Her paintings incorporate a mix of artistic styles, including expressionism, abstractionism, symbolism, naïve art, mathematics, magical realism and postmodernism. Overall, her work is characterized as an intuitive form of painting.

In August 2018, the Ukrainian Postal Service issued a postage stamp featuring Hudyma's painting "Bride" as part of the "Love is Life" series. Another artwork, "Tree of Life", was used for a first day cover.

In December 2024, Hudyma's painting "Christmas Mood" was displayed as a visual backdrop on screens at the Headquarters of the United Nations during a thematic reception. The event was organized by the Permanent Representative of Ukraine to the United Nations for delegations of Member States.

Her artworks are part of private collections in Ukraine, United States, Canada, Armenia, England, France, Germany, Switzerland, Italy, Spain, and Poland.

In December 2022, Hudyma participated in her first solo exhibition in Italy.

== Personal life ==
In 2022, due to the ongoing Russian invasion of Ukraine, Hudyma relocated to Italy with her family.
