= David Boxer =

Jamaican artist and art historian

David Boxer (1946–2017) was a Jamaican artist and art historian. He made and curated a lot of work themed around topics such as death and slavery, focusing on how they impact Jamaican culture.

== Early life and education ==
David Boxer was born in Kingston, Jamaica in 1946. His childhood was spent there, until he moved to the United States to begin his education at Cornell University, graduating with Bachelors in art history in 1969. Boxer would continue his education at Johns Hopkins University, receiving an M.A. in 1972 and a Ph.D. in 1975. After receiving his Ph.D., Boxer would return to Jamaica, where he would stay for the rest of his life.

== Career ==
David Boxer was considered a leading scholar of art in the Caribbean. When he returned from the United States after finishing his education, Boxer became the director and curator for the recently opened National Gallery of Jamaica. Throughout his time with the gallery, he had well over 50 exhibitions. These exhibitions focused on aspects of Jamaican culture, like art being made "for art's sake", championing art that would be considered "intuitive art".

In addition to studying art history and curating exhibits for his museum, David Boxer created a lot of his own artworks. He took a lot of inspiration from the British painter Francis Bacon, whom Boxer wrote his dissertation on. Much of his work focused on themes of slavery and death. His works would be featured in multiple Biennials and collections in museums.

Some works made by Boxer include Diaspora, Chorus of souls postscript, Havana Postscript, which was featured in the Passage Installation, Still Life with Chrysanthemums, Still Life – Fugue, and Triptych Renaissance. Boxer also wrote several books related to art history.

Boxer stepped down as head of the National Gallery of Jamaica in 2013. He died in 2017 at the age of 71.

He received the Order of Jamaica in 2016.
