= The Slave Ship =

1840 painting by J. M. W. Turner

- Slavers Throwing overboard the Dead and Dying—Typhon coming on
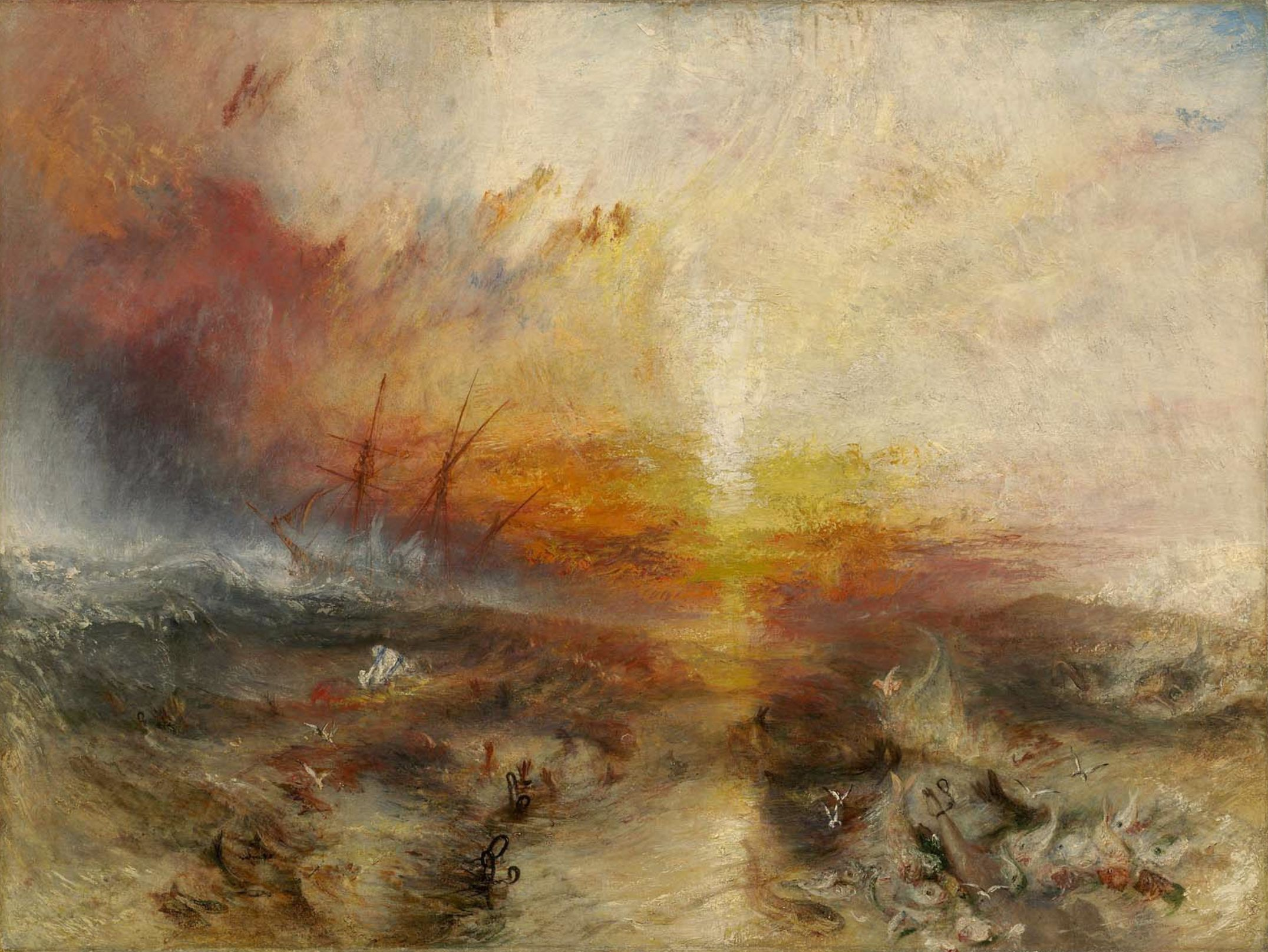
- Artist: J. M. W. Turner
- Year: 1840
- Medium: Oil on canvas
- Dimensions: 91 cm × 123 cm (36 in × 48 in)
- Location: Museum of Fine Arts, Boston
- Website: collections.mfa.org/objects/31102

The Slave Ship, originally titled Slavers Throwing overboard the Dead and Dying—Typhon coming on, is a painting by the British artist J. M. W. Turner, first exhibited at The Royal Academy of Arts in 1840.

Measuring 35 3/4 in × 48 1/4 in (91 cm × 123 cm) in oil on canvas, it is now on display at the Museum of Fine Arts, Boston. In this classic example of a Romantic maritime painting, Turner depicts a ship visible in the background, sailing through a tumultuous sea of churning water and leaving scattered human forms floating in its wake. Turner was possibly moved to paint The Slave Ship after reading about the slave ship Zong in The History and Abolition of the Slave Trade by Thomas Clarkson, the second edition of which was published in 1839. The initial exhibition of the painting in 1840 coincided with international abolitionist campaigns. As the piece changed hands in subsequent years, it was subject to a wide array of conflicting interpretations. While the work is generally admired for its spectacular atmospheric effects, there are conflicting opinions about the relationship between its style and its subject matter.

== Background ==
=== Historical background ===
In 1781, the captain of a slave ship inbound to Jamaica, the Zong, had ordered 132 slaves to be thrown overboard when drinking water was running low so that insurance payments could be collected; slaves who died of natural causes were not covered by insurance. This incident went to court, and the trial that ensued gained wide public attention, building support for the abolition of slavery. Although the trial was deemed to be inconclusive, it was a pivotal catalyst in the movement towards British abolition and a moment that later inspired Turner to portray the incident in The Slave Ship.

While the first organized British abolition movement was started in 1727, the slave trade in the British Empire was not officially abolished until 1807 with slavery itself abolished in 1833. Universal abolition was then at the center of politics following Britain's reform. Motives for the movement were centrally humanitarian, but economic incentives also incited a desire to terminate this commercial act in competing countries.

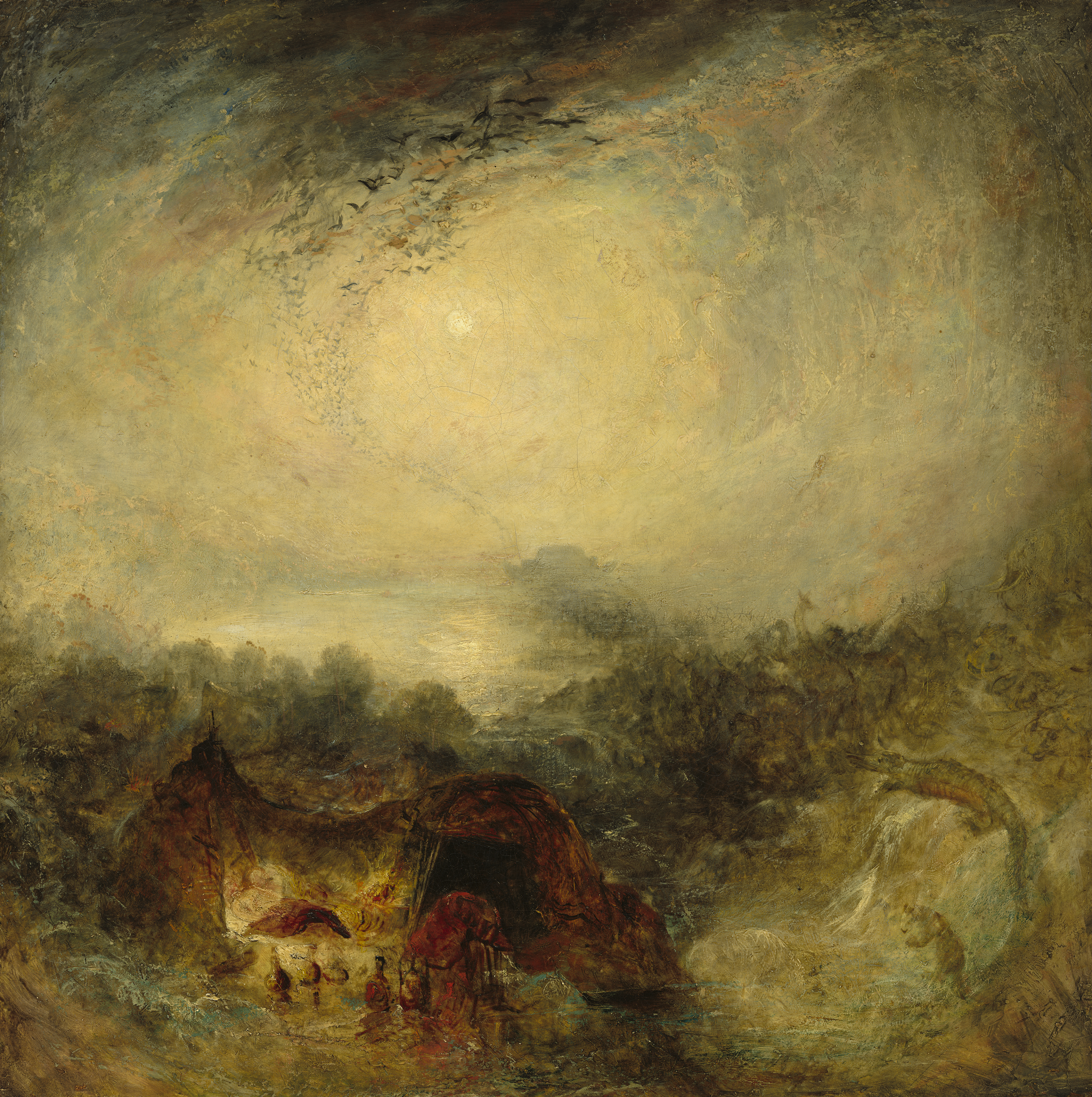
J.M.W. Turner, The Deluge, 1843

=== J. M. W. Turner ===
J. M. W. Turner was a well-known 19th-century landscape painter born in London in 1775, who was highly regarded for his stylistic innovation. His training in the arts was extensive. He started studying at the Royal Academy at the age of fourteen, and gained additional experience in topographical drawings and watercolour working under Dr. Thomas Monro, a physician and alienist, developing his interest in landscapes and distinctive application of colours.

Due to his liberal beliefs and interest in current events, Turner was directly exposed to the campaigns and publications of the anti-slavery societies of his time, the Society for the Mitigation and Gradual Abolition of Slavery Throughout the British Dominions (1823–1838) and the British and Foreign Anti-Slavery Society (founded 1839), which inevitably shaped his abolitionist beliefs. As an abolitionist, Turner was passionate about contributing to the slavery resistance campaigns in international regions, such as in the United States. The first documented sign of Turner's artistic contribution to the anti-slavery movement occurred in 1828 when he dedicated an engraving of his painting The Deluge to a well known abolitionist, John Joshua Proby. Twelve years later, after possibly being informed about the Zong incident from reading The History and Abolition of the Slave Trade by Thomas Clarkson, as well as the Amistad rebellion and subsequent court case in the United States which was international news, Turner was inspired to depict these horrific events in his piece The Slave Ship.

==== Exhibition at The Royal Academy of Arts ====
In 1840, two important international anti-slavery conventions were held in London: "The General Anti-Slavery Society" and "Society of the Extinction of the Slave Trade and the Civilization of Africa." Turner's exhibition of The Slave Ship at the Royal Academy of Arts coincided with these conventions. This public display of a horrific event reminding viewers of Britain's past was intended to evoke an emotional response to the inhumane slave trade still occurring at that time in other parts of the world. Given the context of its initial exhibition, the painting would likely have been interpreted as a political call to action.

When Turner exhibited this picture at the Royal Academy of Arts in 1840 he paired it with the following extract from his unfinished and unpublished poem Fallacies of Hope (1812):

Aloft all hands, strike the top-masts and belay;
Yon angry setting sun and fierce-edged clouds
Declare the Typhon's coming.
Before it sweeps your decks, throw overboard
The dead and dying – ne'er heed their chains
Hope, Hope, fallacious Hope!
Where is thy market now?

== Description ==
=== Subject matter ===
The first impression that the painting creates is of an enormous deep-red sunset over a stormy sea, an indication of an approaching typhoon. This ominous typhoon is further indicated by an approaching dramatized storm cloud, creeping into the visible space from the left, with its rich colours sprawling towards an unstained sky. Upon closer inspection one can discern a ship sailing off into the distance. This ship is identifiable as a type of fast vessel used by slavers to escape navy patrollers, characterized by its "low, lean lines and clipper bow." The masts of the ship are red, matching the blood-red colour of the sky and the sickly copper colour of the water, which serves to blur the lines between various objects in the painting. The ship's sails are furled, revealing that it is preparing for the typhoon.

In the right corner of the foreground, a single dark-skinned leg juts out of the water with an iron chain locked around its ankle. It can be assumed the figure is a nude female, as a faint illustration of bare breasts can be found at the very bottom of the image under the leg. A chaotic swarm of seagulls and fish surrounds the leg, as though they are consuming the woman; one fish, in particular, is shown approaching the frenzy with its mouth wide open. This violence is enhanced by spare red blotches around the head of the fish, indicating blood. Smaller dark limbs project from the stormy seas on the left, surrounded by loose chains, alluding to the numerous other slaves who were thrown off the ship and left to drown. Tails of fish swimming in the water around the drowning slaves can be observed, augmenting the scene's turmoil.

=== Artistic style ===
Consistent with Turner's emphasis on colour in many of his other works, the painting's central focus is on the interactions of various colours. Few defined brush strokes appear in the painting, and objects, colours, and figures become indistinct. Objects are defined by colours rather than distinct lines, and some objects, like the human bodies in the water and the incoming storm, having no real border at all are solely defined by the contrast with the pigments around them. The most prominent colours are the red of the sunset, which encroaches into the water and ship, and the maroon of the bodies and hands of the slaves. This approach is characteristic of Turner's painterly style, in which he commonly exaggerates colours and omits details to make forms more fluid and sensational, eliciting an emotional response from the viewer. At the pinnacle of his career, Turner's style minimized the elements of a landscape and abstracted details through indistinct forms and colours.

== Analysis and interpretation ==
=== Analysis ===
Turner's emphasis on colour rather than design is typical of many Romantic works of the time. The indistinct shapes and the pervasiveness of the sunset's blood-red colour serve to illustrate the idea that nature is superior to man. Turner's intentions become more apparent when the painting is considered in relation to the circumstances of the actual Zong incident, which did not happen during a storm but in calm waters. Turner included the impending typhoon and sunset to comment on the atrocities of slave trading. Other colours in the painting, such as the cool blue of the ocean and the black caps of the water, bring the ocean's thrashing movement to life and give the viewer a sense of the cataclysmic nature of the scene. The compositional choice to portray the jettisoned slaves on the margins, scaled down in size, and the slave ship in the distant background, partially concealed by the hazy atmosphere, in favor of the mesmerizing colour work of the sunset and stirring ocean, further serves to decrease the emphasis on humanity and transfer it to the overwhelming power of nature.

=== The sublime ===
By placing the emphasis on nature rather than on figures or objects, Turner evokes the concept of the "sublime" developed by Edmund Burke. The idea of the sublime is of the utter powerlessness and terror of humanity in the face of nature; by dramatizing the strength of the waves and sun, Turner uses The Slave Ship to encapsulate Burke's definition of the term. Turner's decision to paint the work with a series of quick, frenzied brush strokes rather than carefully defined lines adds to the intensity of the painting, serving to make the viewer feel even more overwhelmed. This abstracted depiction of the landscape dramatizes the sheer power of nature, capturing the attention of the viewer and reducing the identifying details of the Zong massacre. The dynamic, vivid colours of the storm moving across an indistinct and bright sky evoke nature's authority and agency. The irregular, diagonal, and overlapping currents of the sea which indistinctly blends into the dark red hues at the horizon create a disorienting effect. This makes the viewer feel as though they are placed directly in the open sea's powerful and unstable entropy.

Turner also demonstrates sublime elements through the terror and violence of the slaves drowning in the foreground of the piece. This terror is enhanced by the hues of red that surround the flailing limbs and the vicious sea creatures that prey on the suffering victims. The dispersed objects and disfigured bodies floating around the violent waves contribute to the visible chaos of the scene.

=== Interpretations ===
These sublime effects in combination with the subject matter of The Slave Ship have elicited various explanations. According to one interpretation, the incoming typhoon is a symbol of impending divine retribution for the slave trade's immorality. This sentiment is supported visually in The Slave Ship by the daunting oncoming typhoon, overshadowing the distant slave ship. This interpretation is supported by the period's abolitionist poetry, which includes divine intervention as a common way of commenting on the inevitable doom of slave trading. Thomas Day's poem, The Dying Negro, is a representative example of the common tone that these poems at the time shared, which most likely influenced Turner's interpretive vision of the Zong incident:

Thanks righteous God! – Revenge shall yet be mine;
Yon flashing lightning gave the dreadful sign,
I see the flames of heavenly anger hurl'd
I hear your thunders shake a guilty world
The time has come the fated hour is nigh,
When guiltless blood shall penetrate the sky
For Africa triumphs - his avenging rage
No tears can soften, and no blood assuage.
He smites the trembling waves, and at the shock
Their fleets are dash'd upon a rock.
He waves his flaming dart, and o'er their plains
In mournful silence, Desolation reigns.

Another interpretation maintains that the slave ship that jettisoned the slaves is not the one depicted in the distance, but that the viewer stands aboard the slave ship. The original title of the painting, Slavers Throwing overboard the Dead and Dying—Typhoon coming on, and the verses of Fallacies of Hope that it is paired with are telling indicators of the events leading up to the scene depicted in the piece. Accordingly, the context of the scene includes the arrival of a typhoon, provoking the captains of the Zong to "throw overboard / the dead and dying – ne'er heed their chains", as described in the poem. However, the actual depiction of the ensuing scene provides "ontological uncertainty", as the visible details are inconsistent with the supposed sequence of events. For instance, the drowning slaves lie at the forefront of the scene, while the slave ship depicted is off in the far distance. If this image is supposed to represent the scene directly following the captain overthrowing the dead and dying, which is supported by the title, poem, and observable metal chains still sitting atop the water's surface, this spatial positioning would not be feasible. Therefore, it would be logical that the viewer is actually aboard the slave ship.

In addition, some viewers have argued that The Slave Ship actually represents Turner's reaction to the Industrial Revolution. The painting might be viewed as an allegory against the exploitation of slaves and other human labor in favor of machines and economic advancement, represented by the coming storm engulfing the cruel captain. However, the storm could also be viewed as a representation of nature's dominance over man and of the ultimate futility in trying to industrialize and advance society.

== Reception and criticism ==
When The Slave Ship was first displayed at Royal Academy of Arts in 1840, it attracted the attention of critics who were dismayed by the horrific subject matter and abstracted style. For instance, one famous review by William Makepeace Thackeray poses the rhetorical question, "Is the painting sublime or ridiculous? Indeed I don't know which." Others harped on Turner's use of colour and fixation on nature's devastation.

After John Ruskin was given the painting by his father in 1844, he added an appreciation of it to the next edition of his book Modern Painters, first published in 1843, which already had much praise for Turner. The book was already famous and influenced the public's understanding of the painting. His text places the viewer directly in front of the painting, developing an emotional response to the painting's sublimity. As a result of Ruskin's writing, the actual painting was not necessarily needed for people to feel that they had experienced it. Ruskin's enthusiam for the piece is evident as he writes, "If I were reduced to rest Turner's immortality upon any single work, I should choose this." Ruskin did have his own critics though; most notably, Mark Twain. In his 1880 book A Tramp Abroad, Volume 1, Chapter XXIV, he declaimed:

What a red rag is to a bull, Turner's "Slave Ship" was to me, before I studied art. Mr. Ruskin is educated in art up to a point where that picture throws him into as mad an ecstasy of pleasure as it used to throw me into one of rage, last year, when I was ignorant. His cultivation enables him—and me, now—to see water in that glaring yellow mud, and natural effects in those lurid explosions of mixed smoke and flame, and crimson sunset glories; it reconciles him—and me, now—to the floating of iron cable-chains and other unfloatable things; it reconciles us to fishes swimming around on top of the mud—I mean the water. The most of the picture is a manifest impossibility—that is to say, a lie; and only rigid cultivation can enable a man to find truth in a lie.

Ruskin eventually sold the painting in 1872 to be exhibited at the Metropolitan Museum of Art in New York, where it sparked public interest after Ruskin's publication, and became highly regarded for its atmospheric effects. However, in effect of this attention to solely the aestheticism of the piece over the subject matter, this reaction also generated backlash among critics. As one New York Times critic wrote: "It is the great artists vision of a slaver in peril at sea that the average art pilgrim looks for. He finds only a miracle of light and color."

After The Slave Ship was put on auction in 1876, Alice Hooper purchased it and put it on display at the Museum of Fine Arts in Boston, where it is displayed today. The painting was featured independently in the main gallery of the museum and accompanied by handouts of Ruskin's famous essay and a museum curated description that related the visible attributes of the piece to the history of the slave trade and the abolitionist context that underlies it. As viewers gained a greater understanding of the historic and ethical themes behind Turner's painting, audiences began to consider whether the aesthetic treatment of the subject was appropriate.

=== Ethical dilemma ===
As demonstrated by the general response to the piece when exhibited at the Metropolitan Museum of Art, the aestheticism of the landscape and marginalisation of identifying details of the Zong incident could lead viewers to overlook its historical reference entirely. Many critics since have addressed this dilemma, discussing whether the aesthetic effects of The Slave Ship interfere with the subject matter or appropriately augments it. Those who believe the piece's style reinforces its message argue that the sublime features of the overpowering ocean and oncoming typhoon comment upon the horrors of the slave trade. According to this view, the configuration of the figures in the foreground forces the viewer to face the drowning slaves. As the art critic and professor George Landow explains, "the very closeness of the dying slaves to the spectator [incites the] recognition that the nature which will justly punish the ship is the same nature that is already unjustly devouring the ship's innocent victims." The atmospheric effects can also be interpreted as heightening the premonition of the slave ship's demise, and thus the abolition of slavery entirely.

On the other hand, some critics argue that the aesthetic aspects of the scene dominate the viewer's attention, and the work appropriates the tragic event for artistic pleasure. One critic, Tobias Döring, argued that "the terrors of the [slave] trade have become transfigured as aesthetic objects produced for the delegation of spectators [and] establishing covert complicity between terror and the connoisseur." According to Döring, "aesthetics are bound to politics, in this case to the ideologies of colonialism, which allow the death of slaves to be depicted in a sublime style as they are transformed into the occluded and incomprehensible 'other', inspiring terror in the eyes of the beholder. In this sense, any notion of a decolonized aesthetic is doomed since our very notion of what constitutes the sublime has been forged within a context whereby imperialism imaginatively obscures and distances otherness or alterity".

== Legacy ==
The painting inspired David Dabydeen's 1994 longform poem, Turner.

In 2006 the painting was the focus of episode 5 in the eight-part BBC TV mini-series Simon Schama's Power of Art, broadcast by BBC Two.

In 2018 the unpublished poem extract Turner used to accompany the painting was used as the introduction to Lupe Fiasco's 2018 album Drogas Wave. The poem extract is read aloud on the opening track, "In the Event of a Typhoon".

== See also ==
- List of paintings by J. M. W. Turner
