= Soukous in Central Park =

Live album by Kanda Bongo Man
- Released: 1993
- Genre: Soukous
- Label: Hannibal
- Producer: Ned Sublette, Sean Barlow

Kanda Bongo Man chronology
Le Rendez-vous des Stades (1993)	Soukous in Central Park (1993)	Welcome to South Africa (1995)

Soukous in Central Park is a live album by the Congolese musician Kanda Bongo Man, released in 1993. Kanda promoted the album with a North American tour.

== Production ==
The album was produced by Ned Sublette and Sean Barlow. It was recorded in Central Park, in New York City, in June 1992. Kanda played for around 6,000 people. The concert was broadcast as part of NPR's "AfroPop Worldwide" program. Kanda sang in Lingala. The majority of the band was made up of African and French musicians.

== Critical reception ==
Professional ratings
Review scores
Source	Rating
AllMusic	4.5/5 stars
Robert Christgau	A−
The Encyclopedia of Popular Music	4/5 stars
Los Angeles Daily News	3/4 stars
MusicHound World: The Essential Album Guide	4/5 stars

The Colorado Springs Gazette-Telegraph wrote: "The style is propulsive dance music, limned with guitars that shiver across the songs like musical mercury. Vocalist Kanda calls out to lead guitarist Nene Tshakou throughout the performance as if entranced by the shimmering sound." Robert Christgau noted that "guitarist Nene Tshakou is slightly fleeter and more lyrical (if less dazzling) than [former guitarist] Diblo Dibala."

The Los Angeles Times determined that "Kanda has one of those soothingly raspy voices that could handle American soul music nicely if he were so inclined." The Washington Post stated that "Tshakou's introduction to 'Sai' is just one example of the fast, precise arpeggio playing that will impress guitarists even more than lay listeners." The Boston Globe concluded that "Bongo Man's sweet tenor voice is in fine form—but the dull, compressed sound is like a film over the music, adding distance to the experience."

AllMusic wrote that the album "dances on non-stop with the idiom's patented driving prettiness, beguiling as all-get-out but without peaks and valleys, in a steady-state hyper-competence that never sags but never builds." In 2010, The Sydney Morning Herald opined that Tshakou "is one of the great axemen, irrespective of the style of music."

== Track listing ==
No.	Title	Length
1.	"Liza"
2.	"Bedy"
3.	"Yesu Christu"
4.	"J.T."
5.	"Wallow"
6.	"Luta"
7.	"Sai"
8.	"Lela"
