= M. NourbeSe Philip =

Canadian writer (born 1947)

- Born: February 3, 1947 (age 79); Woodlands, Moriah, Trinidad and Tobago
- Other name: Marlene Nourbese Philip
- Education: University of the West Indies; University of Western Ontario
- Occupation: Writer
- Notable work: She Tries Her Tongue, Her Silence Softly Breaks
- Website: nourbese.com

Marlene Nourbese Philip (born 3 February 1947), usually credited as M. NourbeSe Philip, is a Canadian poet, novelist, playwright, essayist and short story writer.

== Life and works ==
Born in the Caribbean St.Ann, Jamaica, Philip graduated in 1965 from Bishop Anstey High School and went on to study at the University of the West Indies, where she received her B.Sc.(Econ.) degree. Moving to Canada in 1968, she subsequently pursued graduate degrees in political science and law at the University of Western Ontario, and practised law in Toronto, Ontario, for seven years. She left her law practice in 1983 to devote time to her writing.

Philip is known for experimentation with literary form and for her commitment to social justice.

Philip has published five books of poetry, two novels, four books of collected essays and two plays. Her short stories, essays, reviews and articles have appeared in magazines and journals in North America and England and her poetry has been extensively anthologized. Her body of work – poetry, fiction and non-fiction – is taught widely at university level and is the subject of much academic writing and critique.

Her first novel, Harriet's Daughter (1988), is widely used in high-school curricula in Ontario, Great Britain and was, for a decade, studied by all children in the Caribbean receiving a high school CXC diploma. It has also been published as an audio cassette, a script for stage and in a German-language edition.

Philip's most renowned poetry book, She Tries Her Tongue, Her Silence Softly Breaks, was awarded the Casa de las Américas Prize for Literature while still in manuscript form.

Her 2008 work Zong! is a poem cycle based on Gregson v. Gilbert, the legal case which determined that the Zong massacre, a mass killing of almost 150 Africans by the crew of a British slave ship, was legal. A dramatized reading of Zong! was workshopped and presented at Harbourfront in Toronto as part of rock.paper.sistahz in 2006. Poems from this collection have been published in Facture, boundary 2 and Fascicle; the latter includes four poems, along with an extensive introduction. On 16 April 2012, at b current studio space in Toronto, Philip held her first authorial full-length reading of Zong!—an innovative interaction-piece lasting seven hours, in which both author and audience performed a cacophonous collective reading of the work from beginning to end. In solidarity with this collective reading, another audience-performance was held in Bloemfontein, South Africa. In 2024, upon its fifteenth anniversary, Zong! was republished by Graywolf Press with a new preface and two introductions.

Her writing has been featured in many anthologies, including International Feminist Fiction (edited by Julia Penelope and Sarah Valentine, 1992), Daughters of Africa (edited by Margaret Busby, 1992), Oxford Book of Stories by Canadian Women in English (edited by Rosemary Sullivan, 2000), among others.

== Bibliography ==
=== Poetry ===
- Thorns (1980)
- Salmon Courage (1983)
- She Tries Her Tongue, Her Silence Softly Breaks (1989)
- Discourse on the Logic of Language (1989)
- Zong! (2008)

=== Novels ===
- Harriet's Daughter (1988)
  - Harriet und schwarz wie ich. Transl. Nina Schindler. Anrich, Kevelaer 1993 (in German)
- Looking for Livingstone: An Odyssey of Silence (1991)

=== Essays ===
- Frontiers: Essays and Writings on Racism and Culture (1992)
- Showing Grit: Showboating North of the 44th Parallel (1993)
- CARIBANA: African Roots and Continuities - Race, Space and the Poetics of Moving (1996)
- Genealogy of Resistance and Other Essays (1997)
- Bla_k: Essays and Interviews (2017)

=== Drama ===
- Coups and Calypsos (1999)
- Harriet's Daughter (2000)

== Awards ==
- Casa de las Américas Prize for the manuscript version of her poetry book She Tries Her Tongue..., 1998
- Tradewinds Collective (Trinidad & Tobago) Poetry – 1st prize, 1988 and Short Story – 1st prize, 1988
- Canadian Library Association prize for children's literature, runner-up, for Harriet's Daughter - 1989
- Max and Greta Abel Award for Multicultural Literature, first runner-up for Harriet's Daughter - 1989
- Guggenheim Fellow, in poetry – 1990
- MacDowell Fellow – 1991
- Lawrence Foundation Award for the short story "Stop Frame" published in the journal Prairie Schooner - 1995
- Toronto Arts Award in writing and publishing, finalist – 1995
- Rebels for a Cause award, the Elizabeth Fry Society of Toronto – 2001
- Woman of Distinction award in the Arts, YWCA - 2001
- Chalmers Fellowship in Poetry – 2002
- Rockefeller Foundation residency in Bellagio, Italy - 2005
- PEN/Nabokov Award for International Literature - 2020
- Molson Prize - 2021
- Windham-Campbell Literature Prize - 2024
