= Kwassa Kwassa (album) =

1989 soukous album by Kanda Bongo Man

Studio album by Kanda Bongo Man
- Released: 1989
- Genre: Soukous
- Length: 57:55
- Label: Hannibal

Kanda Bongo Man chronology
Sai Liza (1988)	Kwassa Kwassa (1989)	Isambe Monie (1990)

Professional ratings
Review scores
Source	Rating
AllMusic	3/5 stars
Hi-Fi News & Record Review	A*:1

Kwassa Kwassa is a soukous album by Kanda Bongo Man, released 1989.

== Critical reception ==
Martin Aston, writing in the British music newspaper Music Week, gave the album a positive review. He wrote: "Francophone soukous practically defines the genre and energy; entwining, zinging guitars, tight rhythms, honey-sweet choruses, non-stop organic from top to toe." The only thing that he did not like was the absence of "helpful sleevenotes". Myles Boisen of AllMusic found the music "very uptempo and infectious".

== Track listing ==
All tracks are written by Kanda Bongo Man

Side A
No.	Title	Length
1.	"Sai"	6:24
2.	"Cantique"	5:15
3.	"Naloti"	5:20
4.	"Lowazo"	5:19

Side B
No.	Title	Length
1.	"Lela-Lela"	6:12
2.	"Bedy"	5:12
3.	"Liza"	6:32
4.	"Lisote"	4:47

CD bonus tracks
No.	Title	Length
1.	"Belle Amie"	7:27
2.	"Ebeneza"	5:40
Total length:		52:01

== Personnel ==
- Kanda Bongo Man — lead vocals
- Diblo Dibala — lead guitar
- Rigo Star — lead guitar
- Lokassa Ya Mbongo — rhythm guitar
- Pablo Lubadika Porthos — bass guitar
- Ringo Yaya Pezo — drums, percussion
- Ti Jean — drums, percussion
- Evelyn Marlin — backing vocals
- Gena Mandako — backing vocals
