= Kanda Bongo Man =

Congolese soukous musician (born 1955)

- Born: Bongo Kanda; 1 January 1955 (age 71); Inongo, Belgian Congo (present-day Democratic Republic of Congo)
- Genres: Soukous, kwassa kwassa music
- Occupations: Singer, musician
- Instruments: Vocals, guitar
- Years active: 1973–present
- Label: Bongo Man

Bongo Kanda (born 1 January 1955), better known by his stage name Kanda Bongo Man, is a Congolese soukous musician and singer. His career debuted in 1973, when he became the singer for the Belle Mambo band, developing a sound influenced by Tabu Ley. His solo career only started to take off after he moved to Paris in 1979, where his music started to incorporate elements of then-vibrant zouk music popularized by Kassav (originating in the French West Indies). Kanda Bongo Man's first solo albums, Iyole in 1981 and Djessy in 1982, were hits.

He is known for the structural changes he implemented to soukous music. The previous approach was to sing several verses and have one guitar solo at the end of the song. Kanda Bongo Man revolutionized soukous by encouraging guitar solos after every verse and even sometimes at the beginning of the song. His form of soukous gave birth to the kwassa kwassa dance rhythm, where the hips move back and forth while the hands move to follow the hips.

Like many African rumba and soukous musicians before him, Kanda Bongo Man also had an entourage of musicians. Many of his musicians later moved on to start their own solo careers. Most notable of these was Diblo Dibala, known as "Machine Gun", who was a vital part of Kanda Bongo Man's line-up on several albums, playing guitar on both Kwasa Kwasa and Amour Fou.

Kanda Bongo Man still tours in Europe and the United States. In July 2005, he performed at the LIVE 8: Africa Calling concert in Cornwall. He has performed several times at the Africa Oyé Festival in Liverpool, most recently in June 2022.

== Discography ==
- Iyole (1981)
- Djessy (1982)
- Amour Fou (1984)
- Malinga (1985)
- Lela Lela (1986)
- Sai Liza (1987)
- Kwassa Kwassa (1989)
- Isambe Monie (1990)
- Zing Zong (1991)
- Sango (1992)
- Le Rendez-vous des Stades (1993)
- Soukous in Central Park (1993)
- Welcome to South Africa (1995)
- Francophonix (1999)
- The Very Best of Kanda Bongo Man (Nascente) (2001)
- Balobi (2002)
- Swalati (2003)
- Non-Stop Feeling (2010)
- Sweet (2010)
- Yolele! Live in Concert (2021)
- Kekete Bue (2022)
