= Zing Zong =

Studio album by Kanda Bongo Man
- Released: 1991
- Studios: Studio Caroline, Paris
- Genre: Soukous
- Length: 45:33
- Label: Hannibal

Kanda Bongo Man chronology
Isambe Monie (1990)	Zing Zong (1991)	Sango (1992)

Zing Zong is an album by the Congolese musician Kanda Bongo Man, released in 1991. The album is dedicated to the memory of Soki Vangu and his brother Soki Dianzenza (also known as Emile and Maxime Soki), who were in the earlier Zairean soukous band Orchestre Bella Bella. Both brothers died within a year of each other. "Freres Soki" is a tribute to them, and "Zing-Zong" is a reworking of a Bella Bella hit, "Houleux Houleux". Kanda supported the album with a North American tour.

== Production ==
The album was produced by Kanda Bongo Man. Nene Tchakou played guitar. Kanda Bongo Man sang in Lingala and French. "Yesu Christu" is a tribute to Jesus Christ.

== Critical reception ==
Professional ratings
Review scores
Source	Rating
AllMusic	3/5 stars
Los Angeles Daily News	2/4 stars

The Washington Post called the album "a seamless, recurring weave of effervescent guitars, light, undulating rhythms and Kanda's sweet soul vocals." The Boston Herald wrote that "Kanda adds a slinky horn section to the traditional Zairean rhumba with its galloping drums, rippling guitar interplay and call-and-response singing." The Los Angeles Daily News determined that "the musicianship is still high, but the endlessly repeating beat becomes tedious."

== Track listing ==
1. "Zing-Zong" – 4:55
2. "Isambe" – 5:52
3. "Mosali" – 4:52
4. "Wallow" – 5:01
5. "Monie" – 4:48
6. "Yonde Love Me" – 4:45
7. "Yesu Christu" – 5:14
8. "Freres Soki" – 4:50
9. "Kadhi" – 5:17

All compositions by Kanda Bongo Man except "Zing Zong", by Soki Vangu and Kanda Bongo Man.

== Personnel ==
- Kanda Bongo Man: lead vocals
- Nene Tchakou: lead guitar on 1,2,3,6,7,8
- Dally: lead guitar on 4,5,9
- Mimi Kazidonna: rhythm guitar
- Komba Bellow: drums
- Modero: saxophone on 1,3
- Kaber Kabasele: trumpet & percussion on 1,3,6
- Backing vocals: Odette & Kanda Bongo Man on 4,7; Jena Mandako on 1,3,6
- Engineers: Jacky Reggan and Jerome
