= Zong massacre =

1781 mass killing of enslaved Africans

Coordinates: 18.025°N 77.852°W

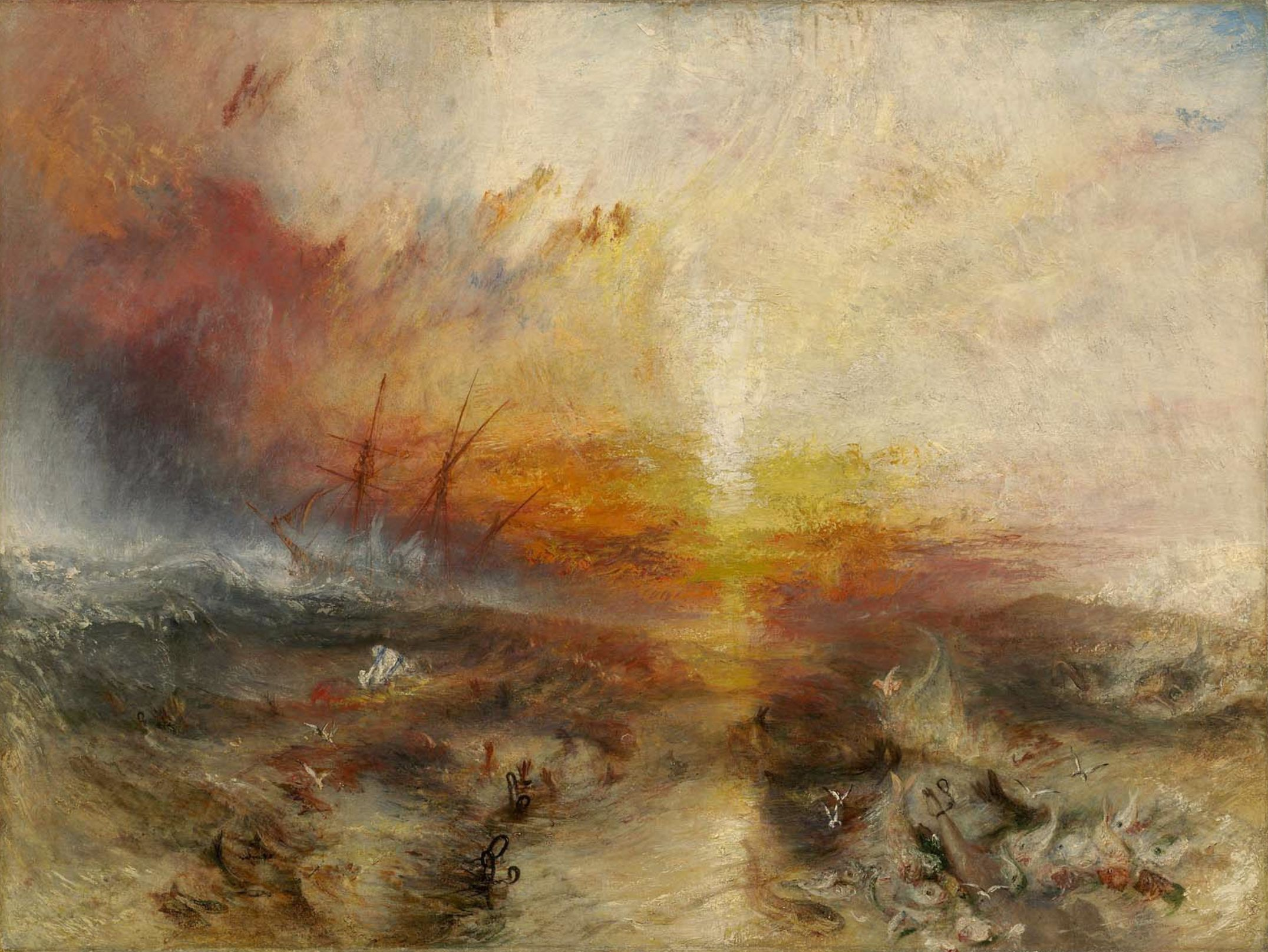
The Slave Ship (1840), J. M. W. Turner's representation of the mass killing of enslaved people, inspired by the Zong killings

The Zong massacre was a mass killing of more than 130 enslaved African people by the crew of the British slave ship Zong over several days from 29 November 1781. (Note: The number of deaths is unknown, but James Kelsall (Zong's first mate) later said that "the outside number of drowned amounted to 142 in the whole".) The William Gregson slave-trading syndicate, based in Liverpool, owned the ship as part of the Atlantic slave trade. As was common business practice, they had taken out insurance on the lives of the enslaved Africans as cargo. According to the crew, when the ship ran low on drinking water after a series of navigational errors, the crew threw enslaved Africans overboard.

After the slaver ship reached port at Black River, Jamaica, Zong's owners made a claim to their insurers for the loss of the enslaved Africans. When the insurers refused to pay, the resulting court cases (Gregson v Gilbert (1783) 3 Doug. KB 232) held that in some circumstances, the murder of enslaved Africans was legal and that insurers could be required to pay for those who had died. The jury found for the slavers but at a subsequent appeal hearing the judges, led by Lord Chief Justice, the Earl of Mansfield, ruled against the slave-trading syndicate owners, on the grounds that new evidence suggested that the captain and crew were at fault.

Following the first trial, Olaudah Equiano, a freedman, brought news of the massacre to the attention of the anti-slavery campaigner Granville Sharp, who worked unsuccessfully to have the ship's crew prosecuted for murder. Because of the legal dispute, reports of the massacre received increased publicity, stimulating the abolitionist movement in the late 18th and early 19th centuries; the Zong events were increasingly cited as a powerful symbol of the horrors of the Middle Passage, the transoceanic route by which enslaved Africans were brought to the New World.

The non-denominational Society for Effecting the Abolition of the Slave Trade was founded in 1787. The next year, Parliament passed the Slave Trade Act 1788, its first law regulating the slave trade, to limit the number of slaves per ship. Then, in 1791, Parliament prohibited insurance companies from reimbursing ship owners when enslaved Africans were murdered by being thrown overboard. The massacre has also inspired works of art and literature. It was remembered in London in 2007, among events to mark the bicentenary of the British Slave Trade Act 1807, which abolished British participation in the African slave trade (though stopped short of outlawing slavery). A monument to the murdered enslaved Africans on Zong was installed at Black River, Jamaica.

== Zong ==
The ship that later became known as Zong was a square stern ship of 110 tons burthen owned by the Dutch company Middelburgsche Commercie Compagnie which in 1777 were operating it as a slave ship from Middelburg, Netherlands, to deliver enslaved Africans to the Dutch colony of Surinam in South America. It was at that time named Zorg.

On 10 February 1781, during the Fourth Anglo-Dutch War, the Zorg was captured by the British 18-gun brig HMS Alert, who took it on to Cape Coast Castle (in modern day Ghana), the regional headquarters of the Royal African Company (RAC), arriving on 26 February. In early March, the master of one of the ships there, the William, purchased Zorg on behalf of a syndicate of Liverpool merchants including Edward Wilson, George Case, James Aspinall and William, James and John Gregson. Gregson, who had served as mayor of Liverpool in 1762, had an interest in 50 slaving voyages between 1747 and 1780. By the end of his life, vessels in which Gregson had a financial stake had carried 58,000 Africans to slavery in the Americas.

Zorg, renamed Zong by its British owners, was paid for with bills of exchange, the 244 slaves already on board forming part of the transaction. Only after the ship had started its voyage was insurance obtained. Another syndicate from Liverpool underwrote the ship and its slaves for £8,000, approximately half the slaves' potential market value, with the remaining risk being borne by the owners.

=== Crew ===
Zong was the first command of Luke Collingwood, formerly the surgeon on the William. While Collingwood lacked experience in navigation and command, ship's surgeons were typically involved in selecting captured Africans for purchase, so their medical expertise supported the determination of "commodity value" for a captive. If the surgeon rejected a captive, that individual suffered "commercial death", being of no value and was liable to be killed by the African traders. Sometimes these killings happened in the presence of the surgeon. It is therefore likely that Collingwood had already witnessed the mass killing of slaves. Historian Jeremy Krikler commented that this may have prepared him psychologically to condone the massacre that later took place on the Zong. Zong's first mate was James Kelsall, who had also served on the William.

The vessel's only passenger, Robert Stubbs, was a former captain of slave ships. In early 1780 he was appointed by the African Committee of the Royal African Company as the governor of Anomabu, a British fortification near Cape Coast Castle in Ghana. This position made him also vice-president of the RAC council of the castle. Due to his ineptitude and enmity incurred with John Roberts, governor of the castle, Stubbs was forced out of the governorship of Anomabu by the RAC council after nine months. Witness statements gathered by the African Committee of the RAC accused him of being a semi-literate drunkard who mismanaged the slave-trading activities of the fort. Stubbs was aboard to return to Britain; Collingwood may have thought his earlier experience on slave ships would be useful.

Zong had a 17-man crew when it left Africa, which was far too small to maintain adequate sanitary conditions on the ship. Mariners willing to risk disease and rebellions on slave ships were difficult to recruit within Britain and were harder to find for a vessel captured from the Dutch off the coast of Africa. Zong was manned with remnants of the previous Dutch crew, the crew of William and with unemployed sailors hired from settlements along the African coast.

== The Middle Passage ==
When Zong sailed from Accra with 442 slaves on 18 August 1781, it had taken on more than twice the number of people that it could safely transport. In the 1780s, British-built ships typically carried 1.75 slaves per ton of the ship's capacity; on the Zong, the ratio was 4.0 per ton. A British slave ship of the period would carry around 193 slaves and it was extremely unusual for a ship of Zong's relatively small size to carry so many. After taking on drinking water at São Tomé, Zong began its voyage across the Atlantic Ocean to Jamaica on 6 September 1781. On 18 or 19 November, the ship neared Tobago in the Caribbean but failed to stop there to replenish its water supplies.

It is unclear who, if anyone, was in charge of the ship at this point, as Collingwood had been gravely ill for some time. The man who would normally have replaced him, first mate James Kelsall, had been suspended from duty following an argument on 14 November. Stubbs had captained a slave ship several decades earlier and he temporarily commanded Zong during Collingwood's incapacitation but he was not a registered member of the vessel's crew. According to the historian James Walvin, the breakdown of the command structure on the ship might explain the subsequent navigational errors and the absence of checks on supplies of drinking water.

=== Massacre ===
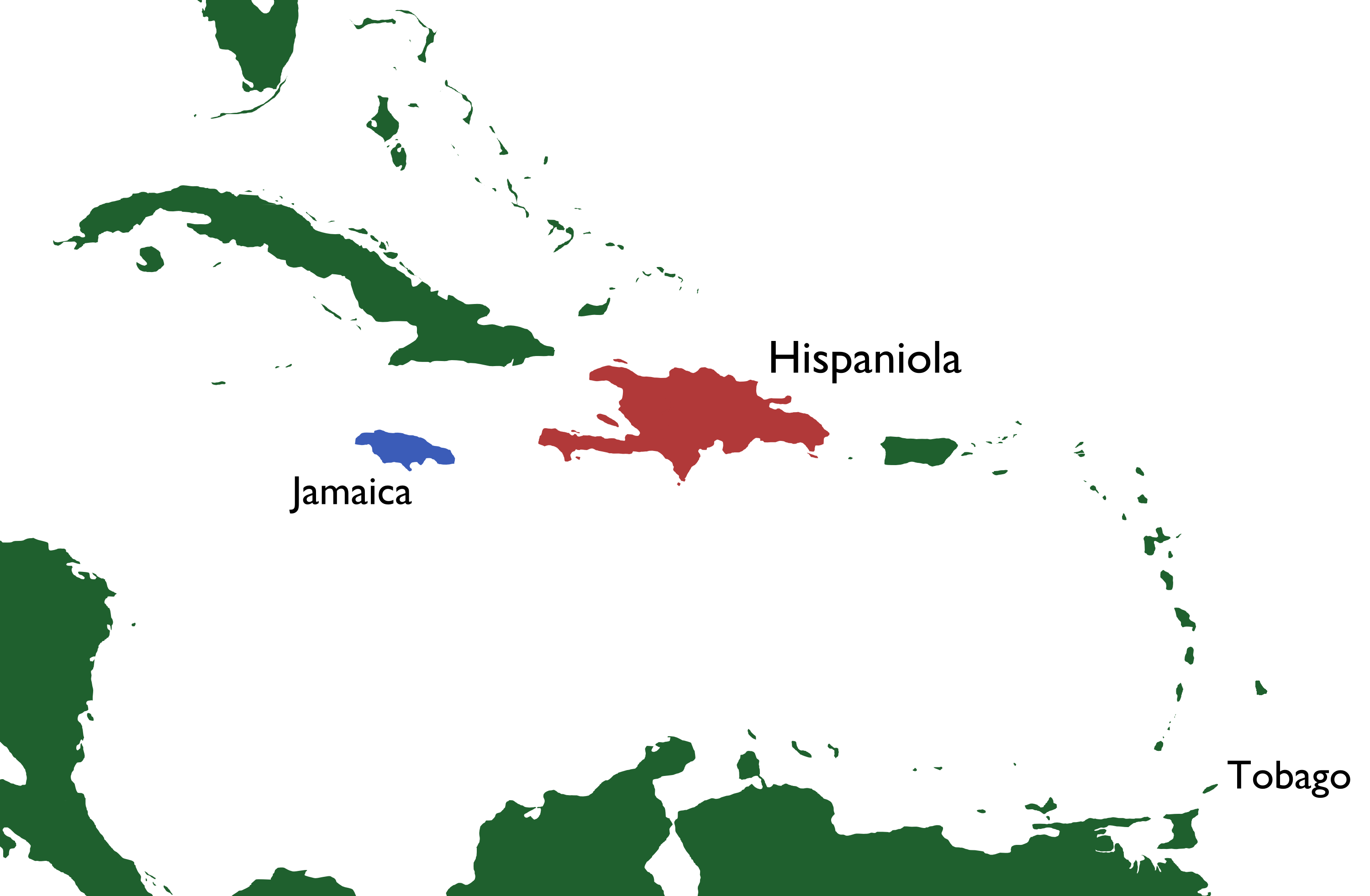
Map of the Caribbean, showing Tobago, Hispaniola (red) and Jamaica (blue)

On 27 or 28 November, the crew sighted Jamaica at a distance of 27 nautical miles (50 km; 31 mi) but misidentified it as the French colony of Saint-Domingue on the island of Hispaniola. Zong continued on its westward course, leaving Jamaica behind. This mistake was recognised only after the ship was 300 miles (480 km) leeward of the island. Overcrowding, malnutrition, accidents and disease had already killed several mariners and approximately 62 Africans. Kelsall later claimed that there was only four days' water remaining on the ship when the navigational error was discovered and Jamaica was still 10 to 13 sailing days away.

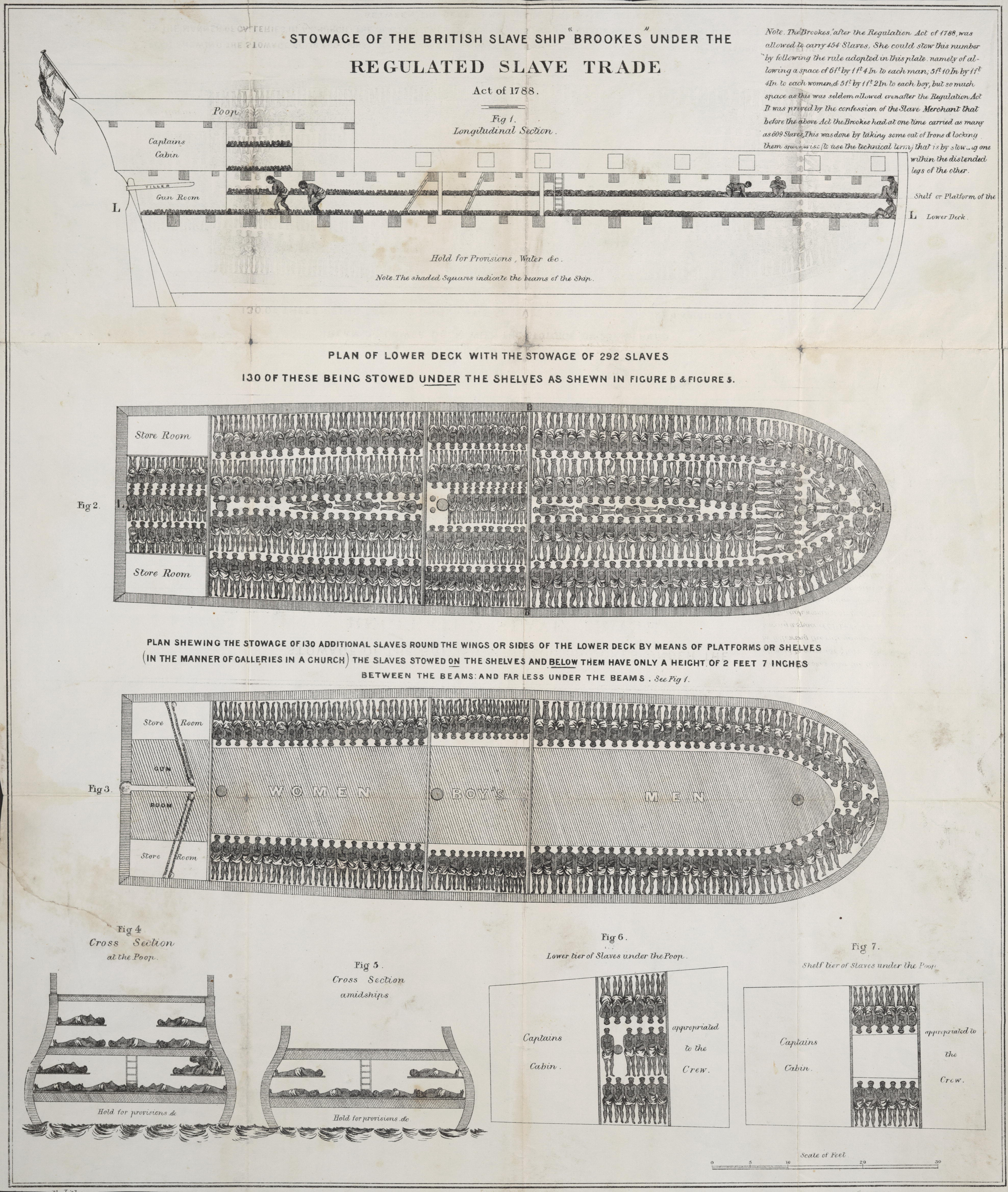
Plan of the slave ship Brookes, carrying 454 slaves. Before the Slave Trade Act 1788, Brookes had transported 609 slaves and was 267 tons burden, making 2.3 slaves per ton. Zong carried 442 enslaved people and was 110 tons burden – 4.0 slaves per ton.

If the slaves died onshore, the Liverpool ship-owners would have had no redress from their insurers. Similarly, if they died a "natural death" (as the contemporary term put it) at sea, then insurance could not be claimed. If some enslaved people were thrown overboard to save the rest of the "cargo" or the ship, then a claim could be made under "general average". (This principle holds that a captain who jettisons part of his cargo to save the rest can claim for the loss from his insurers.) The ship's insurance covered the loss of slaves at £30 per person.

On 29 November, the crew assembled to consider the proposal that some of the slaves should be thrown overboard. Kelsall later claimed that he had disagreed with the plan at first but it was soon unanimously agreed upon. On 29 November, 54 women and children were thrown through cabin windows into the sea. On 1 December, 42 male slaves were thrown overboard and 36 more followed in the next few days. Another 10, in a display of defiance at the inhumanity of the slavers, chose to commit suicide by jumping into the sea. Having heard the shrieks of the victims as they were thrown into the water, one of the captives requested that the remaining Africans be denied all food and drink rather than being thrown into the sea; the crew ignored this request. In total, 142 Africans were killed by the time the ship reached Jamaica. The account of the King's Bench trial reports that one slave managed to climb back onto the ship after being thrown into the water.

The crew claimed that the Africans had been jettisoned because the ship did not have enough water to keep them all alive for the rest of the voyage. This claim was later disputed, as the ship had 420 imp gal (1,900 L) of water left when it finally arrived in Jamaica on 22 December. An affidavit later made by Kelsall stated that on 1 December, when 42 slaves were killed, it rained heavily for more than a day, allowing six casks of water (sufficient for 11 days) to be collected.

=== Arrival at Jamaica ===
On 22 December 1781, Zong arrived at Black River, Jamaica, with 208 slaves on board, less than half the number taken from Africa. The survivors were sold in the Jamaican slave market in January 1782, typically to labour on sugar plantations where the average lifespan of newly arrived slaves was three years. They sold for an average price of £36 per person. The Jamaican Vice-Admiralty court upheld the legality of the British capture of Zong from the Dutch and the syndicate renamed the ship Richard of Jamaica. Collingwood died three days after Zong reached Jamaica, two years before the 1783 court proceedings about the case.

== Legal proceedings ==
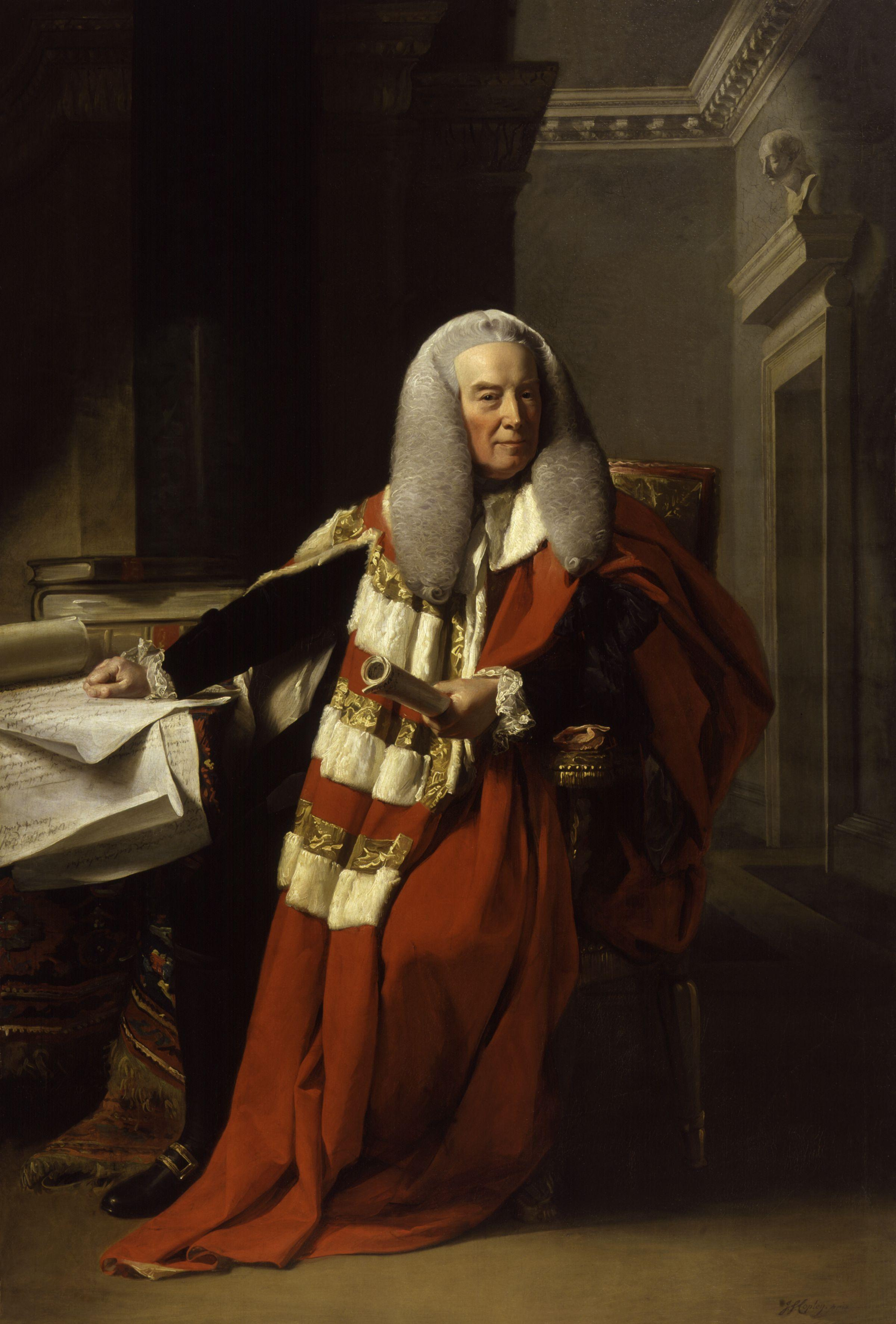
Portrait of Lord Mansfield by John Singleton Copley, 1783. William Murray, 1st Earl of Mansfield in his parliamentary robes as an earl

When news of the Zong massacre reached Great Britain, the ship's owners claimed compensation from their insurers for the loss of the slaves. The insurers refused to pay the claim and the owners took them to court. Zong's logbook went missing after the ship reached Jamaica, two years before the hearings started, so the legal proceedings provide almost all the documentary evidence about the massacre, though there is no formal record of the first trial other than what is referred to in the subsequent appeals hearing. The ship's insurers claimed that the log had been deliberately destroyed, which the Gregson syndicate denied.

Almost all the surviving source material is of questionable reliability. The two witnesses who gave evidence, Stubbs and Kelsall, were strongly motivated to exonerate themselves from blame. (Note: Stubbs gave evidence in court; Kelsall produced an affidavit in the Exchequer proceedings initiated by the insurers.) It is possible that the figures concerning the number of people killed, the amount of water that remained on the ship and the distance beyond Jamaica that Zong had mistakenly sailed are inaccurate.

=== First trial ===
Legal proceedings began when the insurers refused to compensate the owners of Zong. The dispute was initially tried at the Guildhall in London on 6 March 1783, with the Lord Chief Justice, the Earl of Mansfield, overseeing the trial before a jury. Mansfield was previously the judge in Somersett's Case in 1772, which concerned the legality of enslaving people in Britain. He had ruled that slavery had never been established by statute in Britain and was not supported by common law.

Stubbs was the only witness in the first Zong trial and the jury found in favour of the owners, under an established protocol in maritime insurance that considered slaves as cargo. On 19 March 1783, Olaudah Equiano, a former slave, told the anti-slave-trade activist Granville Sharp of the events aboard Zong and a newspaper soon carried a lengthy account, reporting that the captain had ordered the slaves killed in three batches. Sharp sought legal advice the next day, about the possibility of prosecuting the crew for murder.

=== King's Bench appeal ===
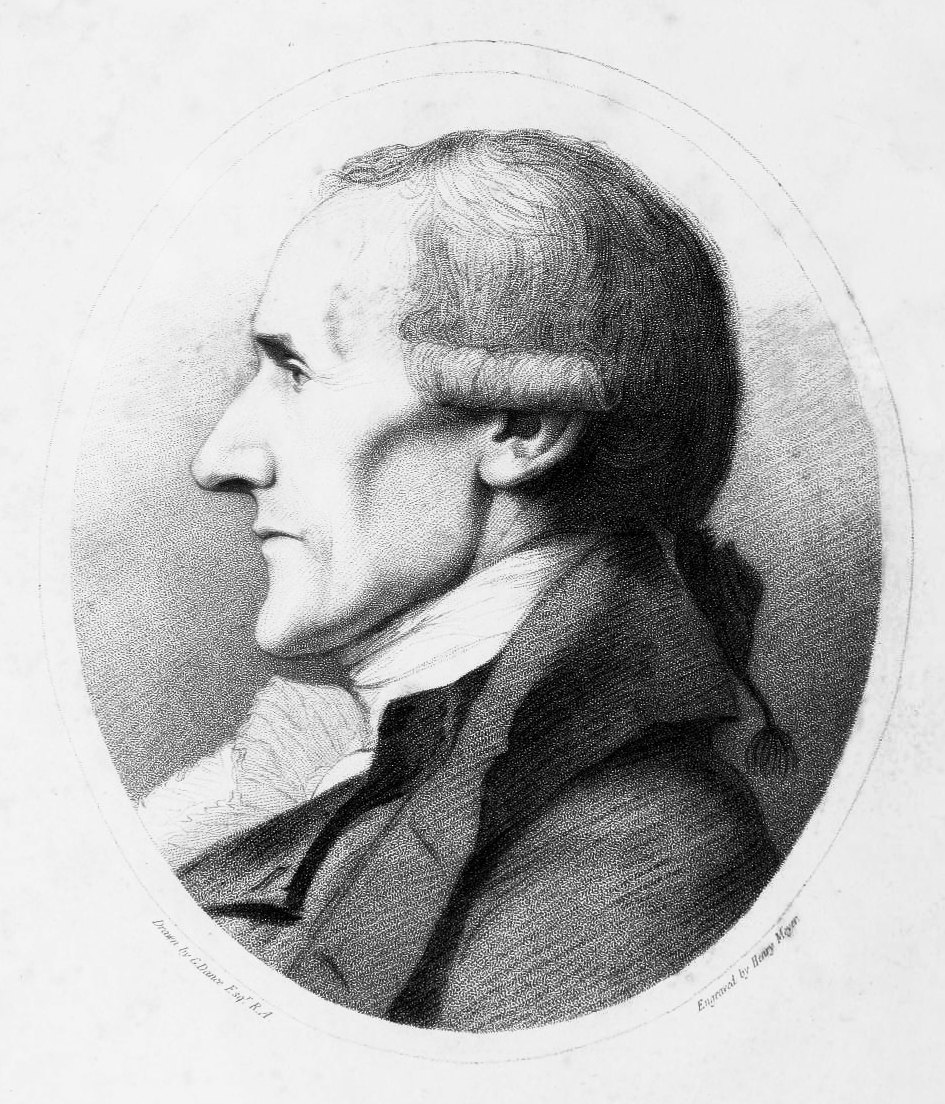
Granville Sharp, from a drawing by George Dance

The insurers applied to the Earl of Mansfield to have the previous verdict set aside and for the case to be tried again. A hearing was held at the Court of King's Bench in Westminster Hall on 21–22 May 1783, before Mansfield and two other King's Bench judges, Mr Justice Buller and Mr Justice Willes. The solicitor-general, John Lee, appeared on behalf of the Zong's owners, as he had done previously in the Guildhall trial. Sharp was also in attendance, together with a secretary he had hired to take a written record of the proceedings.

Summing up the verdict reached in the first trial, Mansfield said that the jury

had no doubt (though it shocks one very much) that the Case of Slaves was the same as if Horses had been thrown over board ... The Question was, whether there was not an Absolute Necessity for throwing them over board to save the rest? The Jury were of opinion there was ...

Collingwood had died in 1781 and the only witness of the massacre to appear at Westminster Hall was again Stubbs, although a written affidavit by first mate Kelsall was made available to the lawyers. Stubbs claimed that there was "an absolute Necessity for throwing over the Negroes", because the crew feared all the slaves would die if they did not throw some into the sea. The insurers argued that Collingwood had made "a Blunder and Mistake" in sailing beyond Jamaica and that slaves had been killed so their owners could claim compensation. They alleged that Collingwood did this because he did not want his first voyage as a slave ship captain to be unprofitable.

Lee responded by saying that the slaves "perished just as a Cargo of Goods perished" and were jettisoned for the greater good of the ship. The insurers' lawyers replied that Lee's argument could never justify the killing of innocent people; each of the three addressed issues of humanity in the treatment of the slaves and said that the actions of Zong's crew were nothing less than murder. The historian James Walvin has argued that it is possible that Sharp directly influenced the strategy of the insurers' legal team.

At the hearing, new evidence was heard, that heavy rain had fallen on the ship on the second day of the killings but still a third batch of slaves was killed. This led Mansfield to order another trial, because the rainfall meant that the killing of those people, after the water shortage had been eased, could not be justified in terms of the greater necessity of saving the ship and the rest of the slaves aboard. One of the judges also said that this evidence invalidated the findings of the jury in the first trial, as the jury had heard testimony that the water shortage resulted from the poor condition of the ship, brought on by unforeseen maritime conditions, rather than from errors committed by its captain. Mansfield concluded that the insurers were not liable for losses resulting from errors committed by Zong's crew.

There is no evidence that another trial was held on this issue. Despite Sharp's efforts, no member of the crew was prosecuted for murder. Even so, the Zong case did eventually gain both national and international attention. A summary of the appeal on the Zong case was eventually published in the nominate reports prepared from the contemporaneous manuscript notes of Sylvester Douglas, Baron Glenbervie, and others. It was published in 1831 as Gregson v Gilbert (1783) 3 Doug. KB 232. (Note: Reprinted in the English Reports in the early 20th century as [1783] EngR 85, 99 E.R. 629 – see CommonLII, PDF.)

=== Mansfield's motives ===
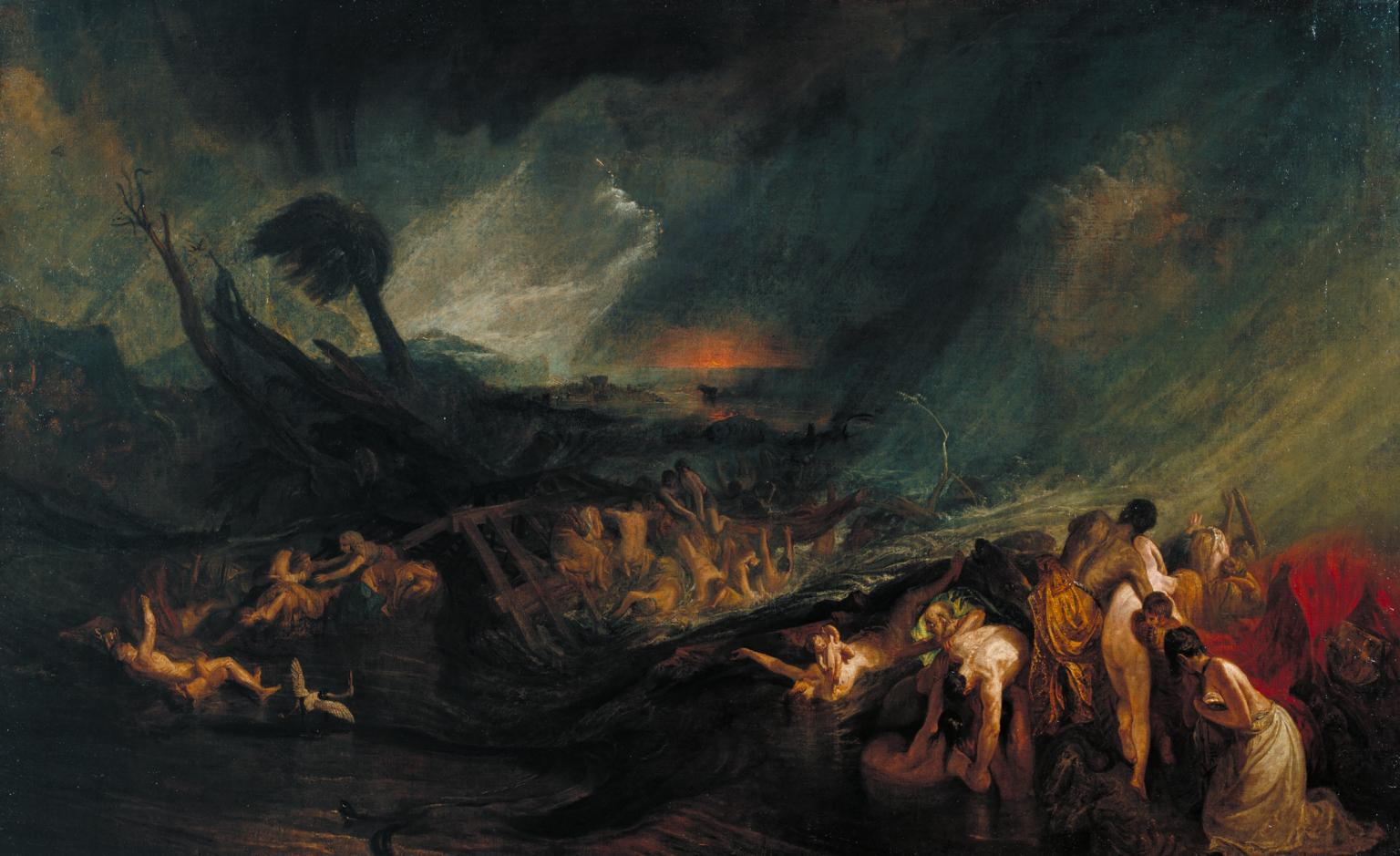
The Deluge by J. M. W. Turner. Oil paint on canvas, support: 1429 × 2356 mm frame: 1800 × 2705 × 127 mm. Tate, 1805. Tate. London.

Jeremy Krikler has argued that Mansfield wanted to ensure that commercial law remained as helpful to Britain's overseas trade as possible and as a consequence was keen to uphold the principle of "general average", even in relation to the killing of humans. For Mansfield to have found in favour of the insurers would have greatly undermined this idea. The revelation that rain had fallen during the period of the killings enabled Mansfield to order a retrial, while leaving the notion of "general average" intact. He emphasised that the massacre would have been legally justified and the owners' insurance claim would have been valid if the water shortage had not arisen from mistakes made by the captain.

Krikler comments that Mansfield's conclusions ignored the ruling precedent of his predecessor, Sir Matthew Hale, that the killing of innocents in the name of self-preservation was unlawful. This ruling was to prove important a century later in R v Dudley and Stephens, which also concerned the justifiability of acts of murder at sea. Mansfield also failed to acknowledge another important legal principle—that no insurance claim can be legal if it arose from an illegal act.

== Effect on the abolitionist movement ==
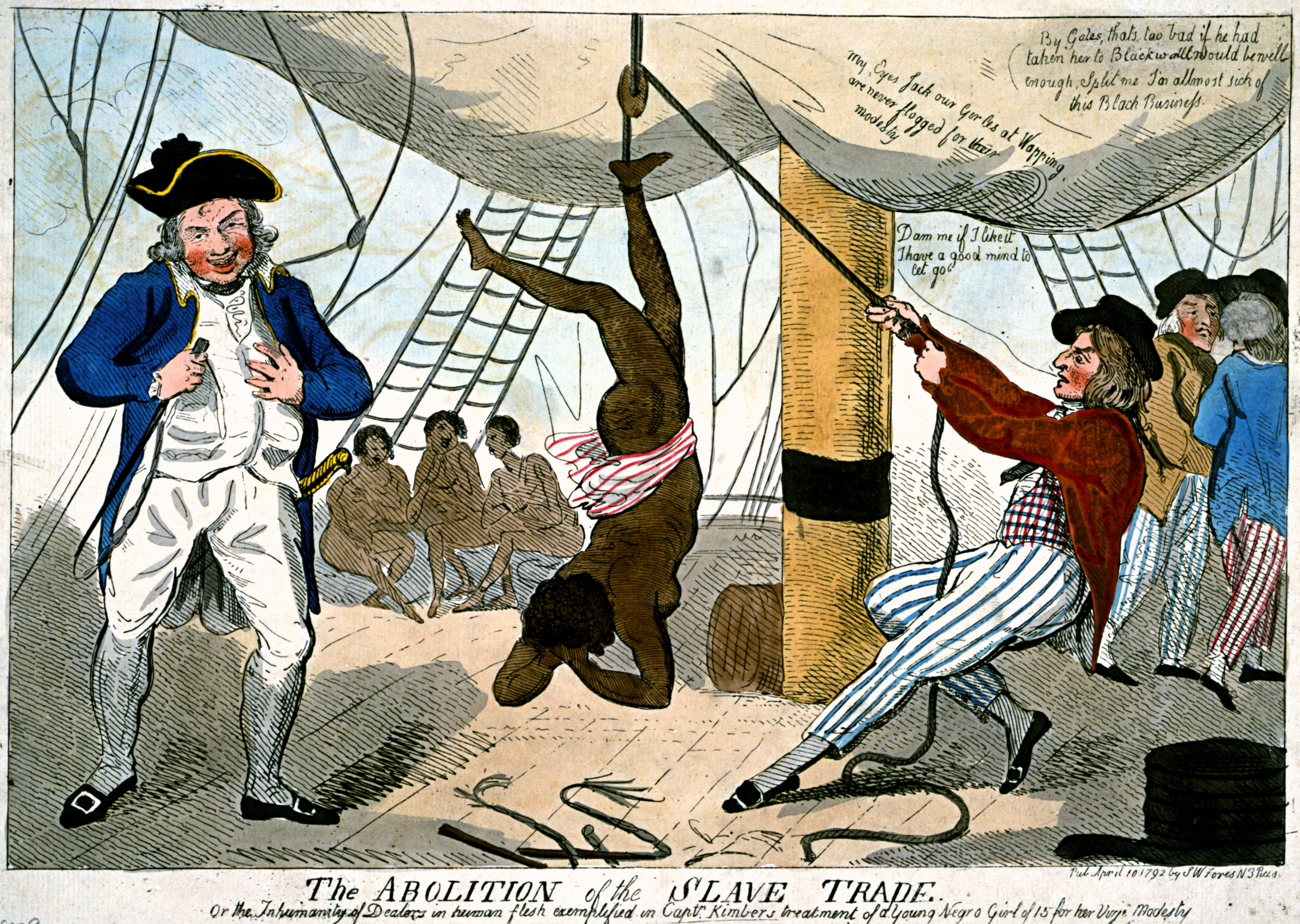
Depiction of the torture of a female slave by Captain John Kimber, produced in 1792. Unlike the crew of Zong, Kimber was tried for the murder of two female slaves. The trial generated substantial news coverage in addition to printed images such as this—unlike the limited reporting of the Zong killings a decade earlier.

Granville Sharp campaigned to raise awareness of the massacre, writing letters to newspapers, the Lords Commissioners of Admiralty and the Prime Minister (the Duke of Portland). Neither Portland nor the Admiralty sent him a reply. Only one London newspaper reported on the first Zong trial, but crucially it was the first public report on what happened and it angered many readers. The newspaper article was an anonymously written letter reprinted on 18 March 1783, about 18 months after the trial. Little else about the massacre appeared in print before 1787.

Despite these setbacks, Sharp's efforts did have some success. In April 1783, he sent an account of the massacre to William Dillwyn, a Quaker, who had asked to see evidence that was critical of the slave trade. The London Yearly Meeting of the Society of Friends decided shortly after to begin campaigning against slavery and a petition signed by 273 Quakers was submitted to parliament in July 1783. Sharp also sent letters to Anglican bishops and clergy and to those already sympathetic to the abolitionist cause.

The immediate effect of the Zong massacre on public opinion was limited, demonstrating—as the historian of abolitionism Seymour Drescher has noted—the challenge that the early abolitionists faced. Following Sharp's efforts, the Zong massacre became an important topic in abolitionist literature and the massacre was discussed in works by Thomas Clarkson, Ottobah Cugoano, James Ramsay and John Newton. These accounts often omitted the names of the ship and its captain, thereby creating, in the words of Srividhya Swaminathan, "a portrait of abuse that could be mapped onto any ship in the Middle Passage". The Zong killings offered a powerful example of the horrors of the slave trade, stimulating the development of the abolitionist movement in Britain, which dramatically expanded in size and influence in the late 1780s. In 1787, the Society for the Abolition of the Slave Trade was founded.

Parliament received numerous petitions against the slave trade and examined the issue in 1788. With strong support by Sir William Dolben, who had toured a slave ship, it passed the Slave Trade Act 1788 (Dolben's Act), which was its first legislation to regulate the slave trade. It restricted the number of slaves that could be transported, to reduce problems of overcrowding and poor sanitation. Its renewal in 1794 included an amendment that limited the scope of insurance policies concerning slaves, rendering illegal such generalised phrases that promised to insure against "all other Perils, Losses, and Misfortunes". (The Zong owners' representatives had highlighted such a phrase in seeking their claim at the King's Bench hearing.) The act had to be renewed annually and Dolben led these efforts, speaking frequently to parliament in opposition to slavery. The Slave Trade Act 1799 was passed to make these provisions permanent.

Abolitionists, notably William Wilberforce, continued their effort to end the slave trade. Britain passed the Slave Trade Act 1807, which prohibited the Atlantic slave trade and the Royal Navy enforced the Blockade of Africa. The United States also prohibited the Atlantic slave trade in 1808 and helped intercept illegal slave ships at sea, predominately after 1842.

In 1823, the Society for the Mitigation and Gradual Abolition of Slavery Throughout the British Dominions (known as the first Anti-Slavery Society) was founded in Britain, dedicated to abolishing slavery throughout the British Empire; the Slavery Abolition Act 1833 represented the achievement of their goal. The Zong massacre was frequently cited in abolitionist literature in the 19th century; Thomas Clarkson's 1808 History of the Rise, Progress, and Accomplishment of the Abolition of the African Slave Trade By the British Parliament included an account of killings, and was known to Jane Austen when she was writing Mansfield Park (1814), with its many allusions to the slave trade in Antigua.

The 1839 edition of Clarkson's book had an important influence on the artist J. M. W. Turner, who displayed a painting at the Royal Academy summer exhibition in 1840 entitled The Slave Ship. The painting depicts a vessel from which a number of manacled slaves have been thrown into the sea, to be devoured by sharks. Some of the details in the painting, such as the shackles worn by the slaves, appear to have been influenced by the illustrations in Clarkson's book. The painting was shown at an important time in the movement to abolish slavery in the world, as the Royal Academy exhibition opened one month before the first World Anti-Slavery Convention in London. The painting was admired by its owner, John Ruskin. It has been described by the 20th-century critic Marcus Wood as one of the few truly great depictions in Western art of the Atlantic slave trade.

== Representations in modern culture ==
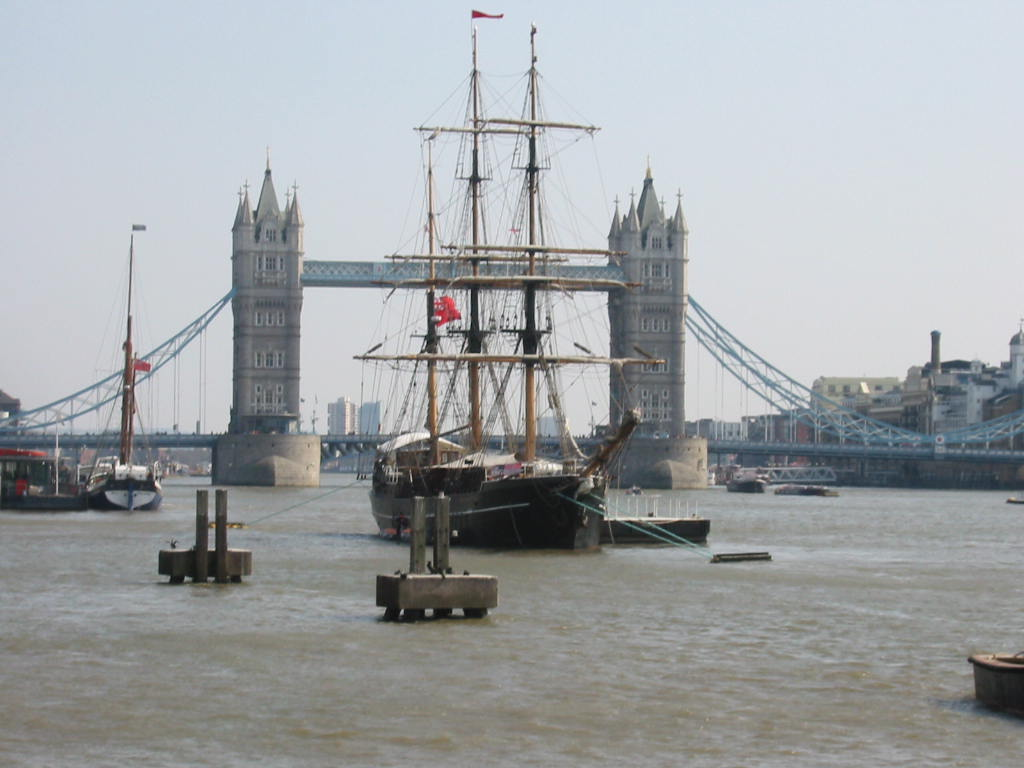
Le Français, appearing as Zong, at Tower Bridge during commemoration of the 200th anniversary of the Act for the Abolition of the Slave Trade in 2007

The Zong massacre has inspired several works of literature. Fred D'Aguiar's novel Feeding the Ghosts (1997) tells the story of an African who survives being thrown overboard from the Zong. In the novel, the journal of the slave—Mintah—is lost, unlike that of Granville Sharp. According to the cultural historian Anita Rupprecht, this signifies the silencing of African voices about the massacre. This event has also been the subject of numerous academic monographs, including Ian Baucom's landmark 2005 study Specters of the Atlantic: Finance Capital, Slavery, and the Philosophy of History."

Margaret Busby's play An African Cargo, staged in 2007 by Nitro (Black Theatre Co-operative) at Greenwich Theatre and directed by Felix Cross, dealt with the massacre and the 1783 trials, making use of the original legal transcripts, interspersed with songs performed a cappella by the cast, including "Steal Away".

M. NourbeSe Philip's 2008 book of poems Zong! is based on the events surrounding the massacre and uses the account of the King's Bench hearing as its primary material. Philip's text physically deconstructs the account as a method for undermining the document's authority.

An episode of the television programme Garrow's Law (2010) is loosely based on the legal events arising from the massacre. The historical William Garrow did not take part in the case, and because the Zong's captain died shortly after arriving in Jamaica, his appearance in court for fraud is also fictional.

In 2014–15, David Boxer, an artist from Jamaica, painted Passage: Flotsam and Jetsam III (Zong).

A play developed by Giles Terera, titled The Meaning of Zong, also deals with the massacre and the 1783 trials. It was jointly commissioned by the Royal National Theatre and three regional theatres and was first staged at the Bristol Old Vic in April 2022.

"The Ship They Called The Zong" is a short film that accompanies a 2020 poem of that name by Liam Doyle and features a number of paintings, photographs and wood cuttings representing various aspects of the Transatlantic slave trade. Some of them, such as the Turner painting and the wood cutting, depict the actual massacre itself.

The Zong legal case is the main theme of the 2013 British period drama film Belle, directed by Amma Asante.

In 2023, Amanda Gorman published the poem "These Means of Dying"—inspired by Philip's poem Zong! and also composed of words from the same court report—in a New York Times column op-ed about the Adriana disaster that left hundreds of migrants dead in the Mediterranean Sea.

In 2025, Siddharth Kara published The Zorg: A Tale of Greed and Murder that Inspired the Abolition of Slavery, a narrative history of the incident that presents new information on who revealed crucial details about what happened on the ship.

=== 2007 abolition commemorations ===
In 2007, a memorial stone was erected at Black River, Jamaica, near where Zong would have landed. A ship representing the Zong was sailed to Tower Bridge in London in March 2007 to commemorate the 200th anniversary of the Act for the Abolition of the Slave Trade, at a cost of £300,000. The vessel housed depictions of the Zong massacre and the slave trade. It was accompanied by HMS Northumberland, on board which was an exhibition commemorating the role of the Royal Navy after 1807 in the suppression of the slave trade.

== See also ==
- Dido Elizabeth Belle (1761–1804), born into slavery but raised as a free woman by Lord Mansfield, her uncle
- Belle, 2013 film
- La Amistad, a ship involved in an important slavery related court case in the US

== Notes and references ==
=== Sources ===
- Boime, Albert (1990). "Turner's Slave Ship: The Victims of Empire" (PDF). Turner Studies. 10 (1): 34–43. Archived from the original (PDF) on 15 December 2013.
- Burnard, Trevor (2019). "A New Look at the Zong Case of 1783". XVII-XVIII. 76 (1). doi:10.4000/1718.1808.
- Burroughs, Robert (2010). "Eyes on the Prize: Journeys in Slave Ships Taken as Prizes by the Royal Navy". Slavery & Abolition. 31 (1): 99–115. doi:10.1080/01440390903481688. S2CID 143940537.
- Drescher, Seymour (2012). "The Shocking Birth of British Abolitionism". Slavery & Abolition. 33 (4): 571–593. doi:10.1080/0144039X.2011.644070. S2CID 145708004.
- Krikler, Jeremy (2007). "The Zong and the Lord Chief Justice". History Workshop Journal. 64 (1): 29–47. doi:10.1093/hwj/dbm035. S2CID 144154697.
- Krikler, Jeremy (2012). "A Chain of Murder in the Slave Trade: A Wider Context of the Zong Massacre". International Review of Social History. 57 (3): 393–415. doi:10.1017/S0020859012000491.
- Lewis, Andrew (2007). "Martin Dockray and the Zong: A Tribute in the Form of a Chronology". Journal of Legal History. 28 (3): 357–370. doi:10.1080/01440360701698551. S2CID 144811837.
- Lovejoy, Paul E. (2006). "Autobiography and Memory: Gustavus Vassa, alias Olaudah Equiano, the African". Slavery & Abolition. 27 (3): 317–347. doi:10.1080/01440390601014302. S2CID 146143041.
- Marsh, Sarah (2020). "Changes of Air: The Somerset Case and Mansfield Park's Imperial Plots". Eighteenth-Century Studies. 53 (2): 211–233. doi:10.1353/ecs.2020.0006. S2CID 213965164.
- Oldham, James (2007). "Insurance Litigation Involving the Zong and Other British Slave Ships, 1780–1807". Journal of Legal History. 28 (3): 299–318. doi:10.1080/01440360701698437. S2CID 145156984.
- Rupprecht, Anita (2007a). "'A Very Uncommon Case': Representations of the Zong and the British Campaign to Abolish the Slave Trade". Journal of Legal History. 28 (3): 329–346. doi:10.1080/01440360701698494. S2CID 144426854.
- Rupprecht, Anita (2007b). "Excessive Memories: Slavery, Insurance and Resistance". History Workshop Journal. 64 (1): 6–28. doi:10.1093/hwj/dbm033. S2CID 154933811.
- Rupprecht, Anita (2008). "A Limited Sort of Property: History, Memory and the Slave Ship Zong". Slavery & Abolition. 29 (2): 265–277. doi:10.1080/01440390802027913. S2CID 144187551.
- Swaminathan, Srividhya (2010). "Reporting Atrocities: A Comparison of the Zong and the Trial of Captain John Kimber". Slavery & Abolition. 31 (4): 483–499. doi:10.1080/0144039X.2010.521336. S2CID 145650558.
- Walvin, James (2011). The Zong: A Massacre, the Law and the End of Slavery. New Haven & London: Yale University Press. ISBN 978-0-300-12555-9.
- Webster, Jane (2007). "The Zong in the Context of the Eighteenth-Century Slave Trade". Journal of Legal History. 28 (3): 285–298. doi:10.1080/01440360701698403. S2CID 144216755.
- Weisbord, Robert (August 1969). "The case of the slave-ship Zong, 1783". History Today. 19 (8): 561–567.
- Wood, Marcus (2000). Blind Memory: Visual Representations of Slavery in England and America, 1780–1865. Manchester: Manchester University Press. ISBN 978-0-7190-5446-4.
