= Zong! =

2008 book-length poem by M. NourbeSe Philip

Zong! is a 2008 book-length poem by Canadian writer M. NourbeSe Philip. The work was first published in the U.S. by Wesleyan University Press and by The Mercury Press in Canada. Phillip has frequently staged full-length readings of the poem internationally as performance art.

The poem focuses on victims of the Zong massacre, approximately 150 enslaved Africans who were murdered for insurance purposes in 1781. Reaction to the massacre and the lawsuits surrounding the case would propel the British abolitionist movement forward. The entire poem is composed solely of words found in the 1783 case Gregson v Gilbert, which determined that the massacre was legal.

Utilizing fragmented poetic form, Zong! disperses words across the page, "mutilating the text" just as "the fabric of African life and the lives of these men, women, and children were mutilated." Here, form is both freedom and constraint, and meaning is derived from "not telling." Likewise, meaning is "not to be made but, rather, felt." The spatial gaps between both letter and word and the silence that follows resists knowing; this is a story that cannot be told, but must be told.

== Controversies ==
In 2016, Philip was approached by award-winning poet and translator Renata Morresi about translating her work into Italian. The translation was eventually published with the title Zong! Come narrato all'autrice da Setaey Adamu Boateng, edited by Renata Morresi and Andrea Raos, translated by Renata Morresi except for the sections "Ebora" (translated by Mariangela Guatteri), "Notanda" and "Gregson vs Gilbert" (translated by Andrea Raos), Benway Series, 2021, with the support of the Canada Council for the Arts. Philip then denounced the Italian translation, claiming that it went forward without her knowledge or consent after her American publishers sold the rights. Philip's reaction, and her launch of a petition asking for the destruction of the book, sparked a heated online debate, the translators defending their position with three bilingual essays on the publisher's website. In 2022 "Testo a fronte", an Italian bi-annual publication specialized in translation studies, published a special issue on the matter, edited by Lorenzo Mari, containing nine essays by authors in favor of and against the Italian book.

Philip has also accused Dutch playwright Rana Hamadeh of heavily using her research and poem in her opera The Ten Murders of Josephine. In a lengthy blog post, she criticized Hamadeh for her use of the poem and its structure.
