= Intuitive art =

Method of creating art

Intuitive art is a method of creating art that emerges from a relationship between an artist and their intuition. Intuitive art can include different forms of art, such as visual art, poetry, and intuitive music. Intuitive art has roots in the surrealist, abstract expressionist and art therapy movements. Inspired by the work of the psychiatrist, Carl Jung, many intuitive artists strive to use art making as a way to connect to their subconscious mind. Intuitive artists often create for the purpose of self-discovery and not to create a saleable product. The intuitive painting movement became popular in the United States after the publication of several books on intuitive art were published in 2008 and 2012. Creating art intuitively may improve health and wellbeing.

== Category ==
The National Gallery of Jamaica has categorized intuitive art as its own artistic canon separate from art that would otherwise be classified by the Western art world as primitive or naive. Veerle Poupeye argues that this has given intuitive artists more legitimacy within the art world that has "allowed them to produce work that would otherwise never have existed."

Traditional Chinese poetry has been connected to the category of intuitive art through the practice of miaowu.

== Effects ==
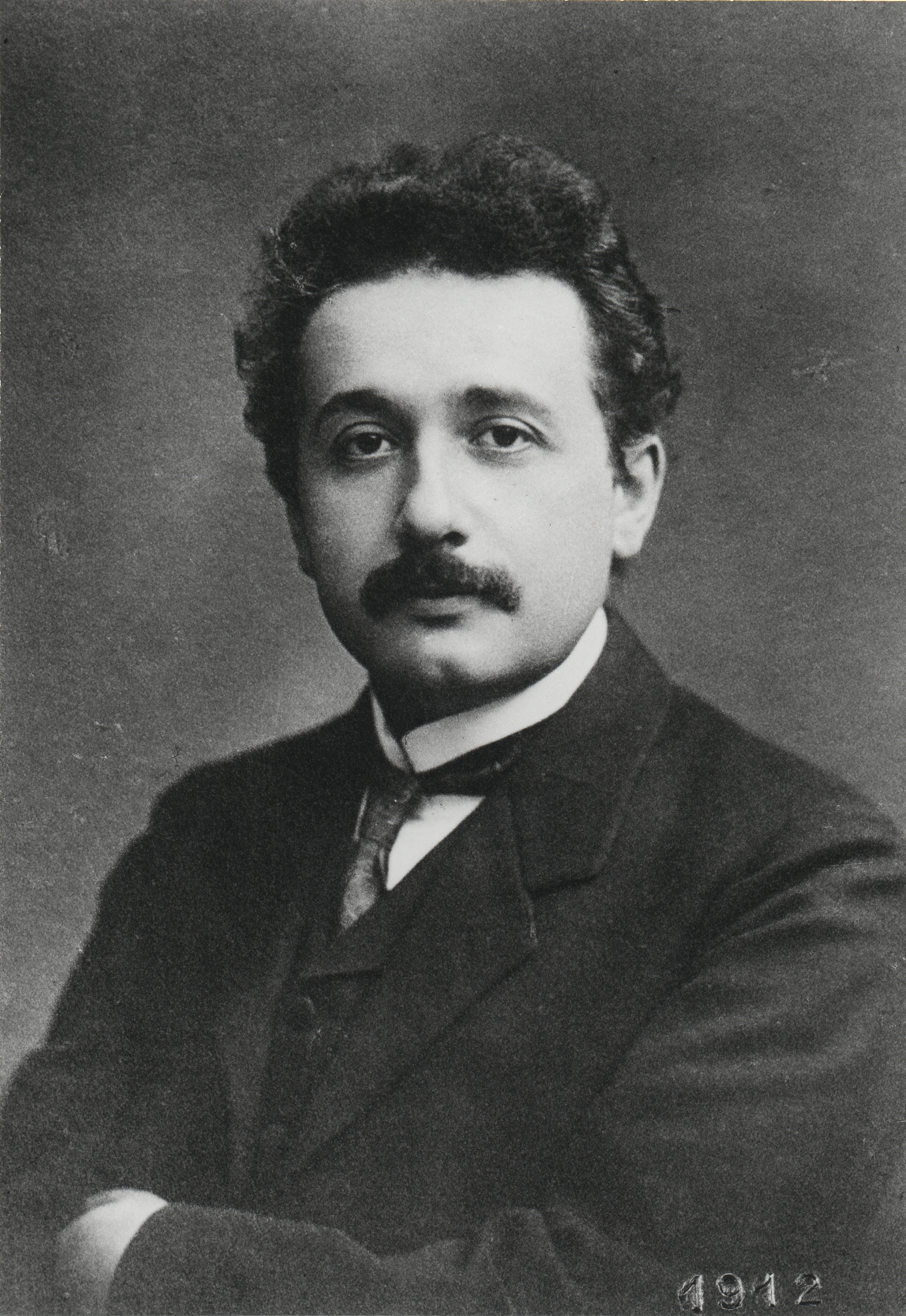
Albert Einstein used intuitive art to stimulate his scientific creativity.

As an art therapy method, intuitive art has been noted as a potential method of processing psychological trauma. Intuitive art has been examined from a neuroscience perspective for its potential connections to improving human health and wellbeing.

The practice may be employed from a young age, including in preschool education, to begin to cultivate the creative needs and capabilities of children within themselves.

The method was connected to the artistic practices Albert Einstein used to stimulate his scientific creativity, particularly through his engagement in playing piano. Einstein himself stated "I often think in music. I live my daydreams in music. I see my life in terms of music.... I get most joy in life out of music." Einstein's son Hans Einstein recorded of his father: "[w]henever he felt that he had come to the end of the road or into a difficult situation in his work, he would take refuge in music, and that would usually resolve all his difficulties." Maja Einstein further noted that he would sometimes reach important conclusions after playing the piano.

Some intuitive artists argue that the method of creating art can be therapeutic and spiritual.
