= Dido Elizabeth Belle =

British gentlewoman (1761–1804)

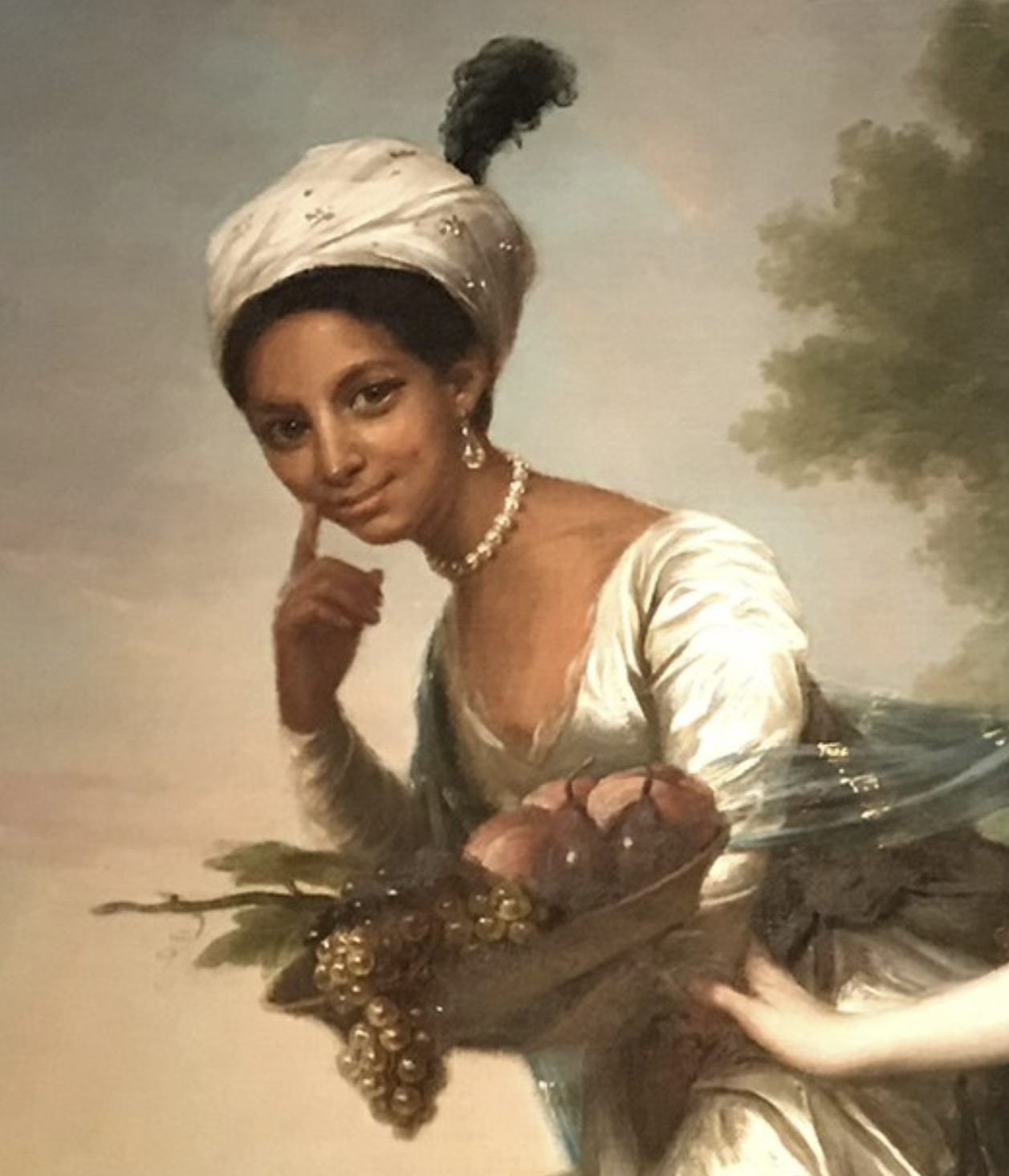
- Painting of Belle (cropped), David Martin
- Born: June 1761; British West Indies
- Died: July 1804 (aged 43); London, England
- Resting place: St George's Fields, Westminster (1804–1970s)
- Education: Kenwood House (a private estate in Hampstead, London)
- Spouse: Louis Jean Charles Davinière (m. 1793)
- Children: 3
- Parents: Sir John Lindsay; Maria Belle
- Relatives: Sir Alexander Lindsay, 3rd Baronet (grandfather); William Murray, 1st Earl of Mansfield (great-uncle); Margaret Lindsay Ramsay (aunt); Lady Elizabeth Murray (cousin)

Dido Elizabeth Belle (June 1761 – July 1804) was a English gentlewoman. She was born into slavery as the illegitimate daughter of Sir John Lindsay, a British career naval officer who was later knighted and promoted to admiral. Her mother was Maria Belle, an enslaved Black woman in the British West Indies. Lindsay took Dido with him when he returned to England in 1765, entrusting her upbringing to his uncle William Murray, 1st Earl of Mansfield, and his wife Elizabeth Murray, Countess of Mansfield.

The Murrays educated Belle, bringing her up as a free gentlewoman at their Kenwood House, together with another great-niece, Lady Elizabeth Murray, whose mother had died. Lady Elizabeth and Belle were second cousins. Belle lived there for 30 years. In his will of 1793, Lord Mansfield provided an outright sum and an annuity to her.

== Early life ==
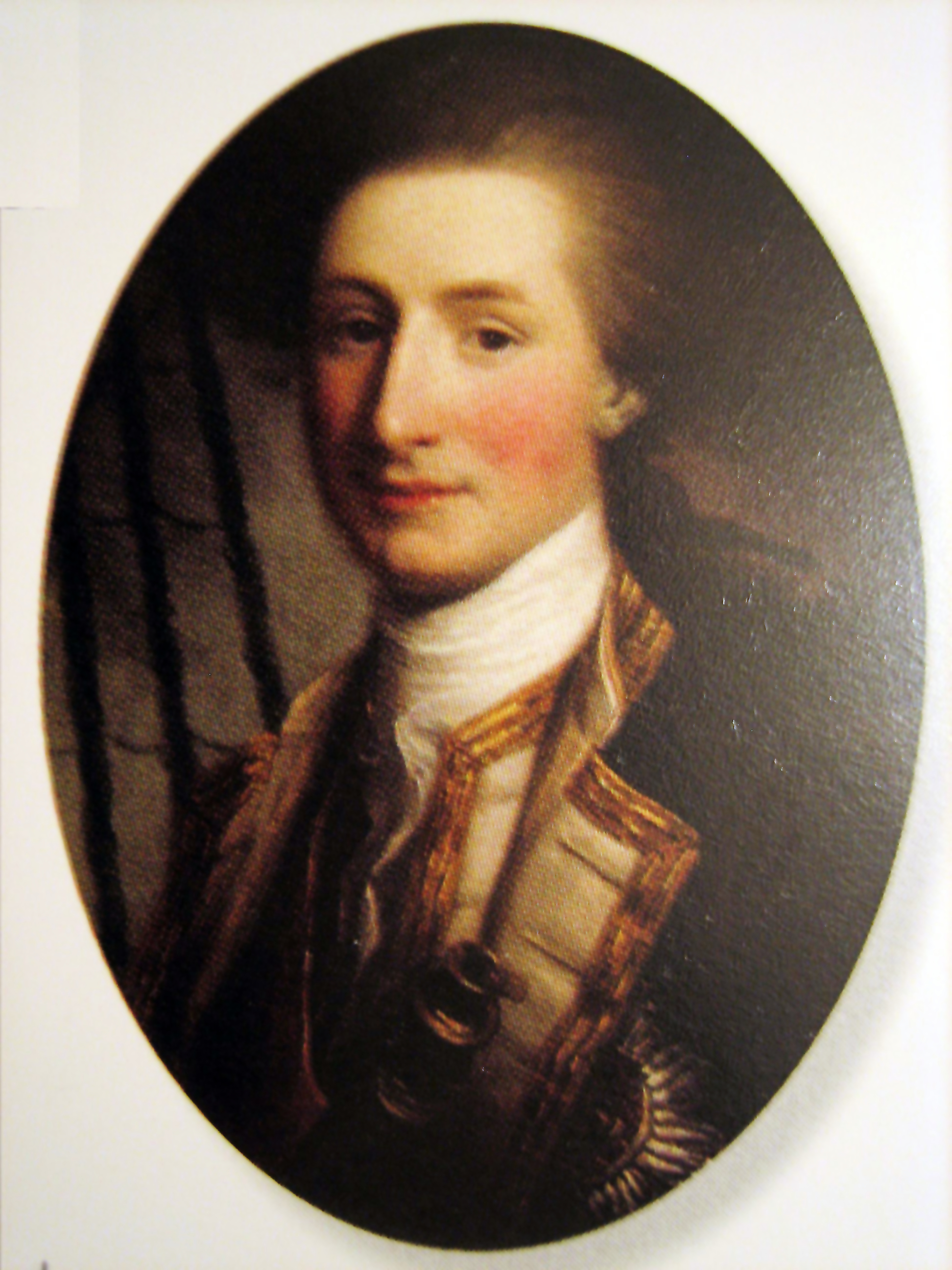
Belle's father Sir John Lindsay

Dido Elizabeth Belle was born into slavery in 1761 in the British West Indies to an enslaved African woman known as Maria Belle and spent part of her childhood in Pensacola in Spanish Florida, where Captain Lindsay was stationed from 1764 to 1765. (Her name was spelled as Maria Bell in Dido's baptism record.) Her father was 24-year-old Sir John Lindsay, a member of the Lindsay of Evelix branch of the Clan Lindsay, who was a career naval officer and then captain of the British warship HMS Trent, based in the West Indies. He was the son of Sir Alexander Lindsay, 3rd Baronet and his wife Amelia, daughter of David Murray, 5th Viscount Stormont.

Lindsay is thought to have found Dido's mother, Maria Belle, held as a slave on a Spanish ship which his forces captured in the Caribbean. Maria Belle was a 14-year-old child slave when she was captured, around the same time she got pregnant by Lindsay, and gave birth to Dido when she was about 15 years old. Her age was confirmed by the Pensacola property record about her later life: "the manumission transaction for the sum of two hundred Spanish milled dollars paid by Maria Belle a Negro Woman Slave about 28 years of age", dated 22 August 1774; this confirmed that Maria Belle was about 14 when Dido was conceived; it is unlikely that the conception was consensual.

Sir John Lindsay returned to London after the war in 1765 with his young daughter and Maria Belle; a year later, he presumably took Dido to Kenwood House in 1766, home of his uncle, William Murray, 1st Earl of Mansfield, and his wife. Belle was baptised as Dido Elizabeth Belle in November 1766 at St George's, Bloomsbury, by her mother, Maria Belle, but Lindsay was absent from the baptism record and likely wasn't in England around this time, as he appeared in Jamaican birth records instead for his two daughters, Ann in November 1766 and Elizabeth in December 1766.

Dido Belle was not publicly acknowledged by her father, Sir John Lindsay, hence she was not given the last name Lindsay, and instead used her mother's last name. Dido also did not receive inheritance or acknowledgement from her father's later will, unlike her half-siblings. Despite being named after the legendary Queen of Carthage, Dido was also a popular name given to female slaves at the time. Dido was then raised at Kenwood with her second cousin, Lady Elizabeth Murray, whose mother had died.

Lindsay married Mary Milner (1740–1799) in 1768. They had no children together. Maria Belle was known to have remained in England with Lindsay until 1774, when Lindsay having made her free and paid for her manumission, also transferred a piece of property in Pensacola to Maria, where she was required to build a house within 10 years; Maria Belle appeared in the Pensacola property record and her manumission paper. In 1776, Lindsay jointly bought a slave plantation in Nevis.

Sir John Lindsay would father a total of five illegitimate children from five different women: Dido Belle in June 1761, John Edward Lindsay in February 1762, Ann Lindsay in November 1766, Elizabeth Lindsay (later Palmer) in December 1766, and John Lindsay in November 1767. Only the latter two were named in his will.

A contemporary obituary of Sir John Lindsay, who had eventually been promoted to admiral, assumed that he was the father of Dido Belle, and included the statement: "[H]e has died, we believe, without any legitimate issue but has left one natural daughter, a Mulatta who has been brought up in Lord Mansfield's family almost from her infancy and whose amiable disposition and accomplishments have gained her the highest respect from all his Lordship's relations and visitants." At one time, historians thought her mother was an African slave on a ship captured by Lindsay's warship during the Siege of Havana, but this specific date is unlikely, as Dido was born in 1761. The obituary also failed to mention the existence of John and Elizabeth Lindsay, named in Sir John Lindsay's will.

== At Kenwood House ==
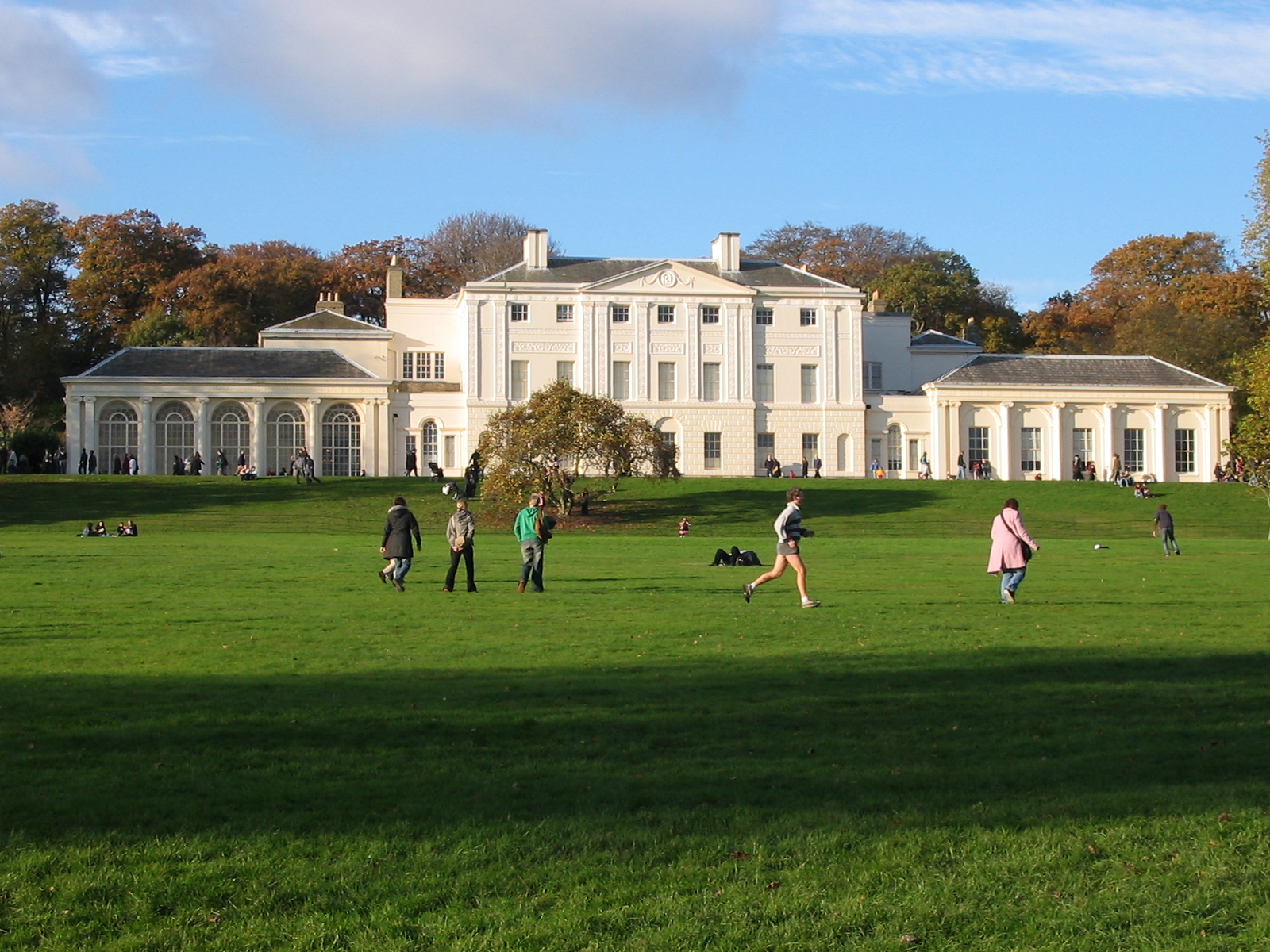
Kenwood House, where Dido Elizabeth Belle spent most of her life before marriage

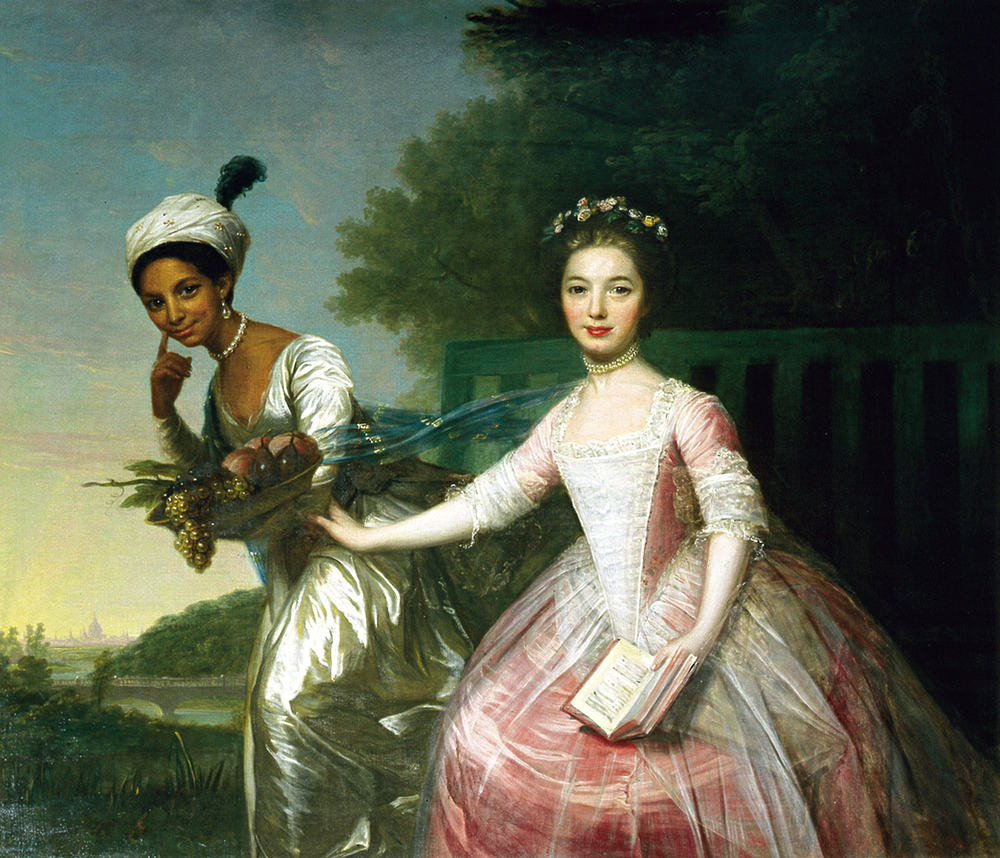
Dido Elizabeth Belle and Lady Elizabeth Murray by David Martin, 1778. Painting of Dido Elizabeth Belle (l) and her cousin Lady Elizabeth Murray (r).

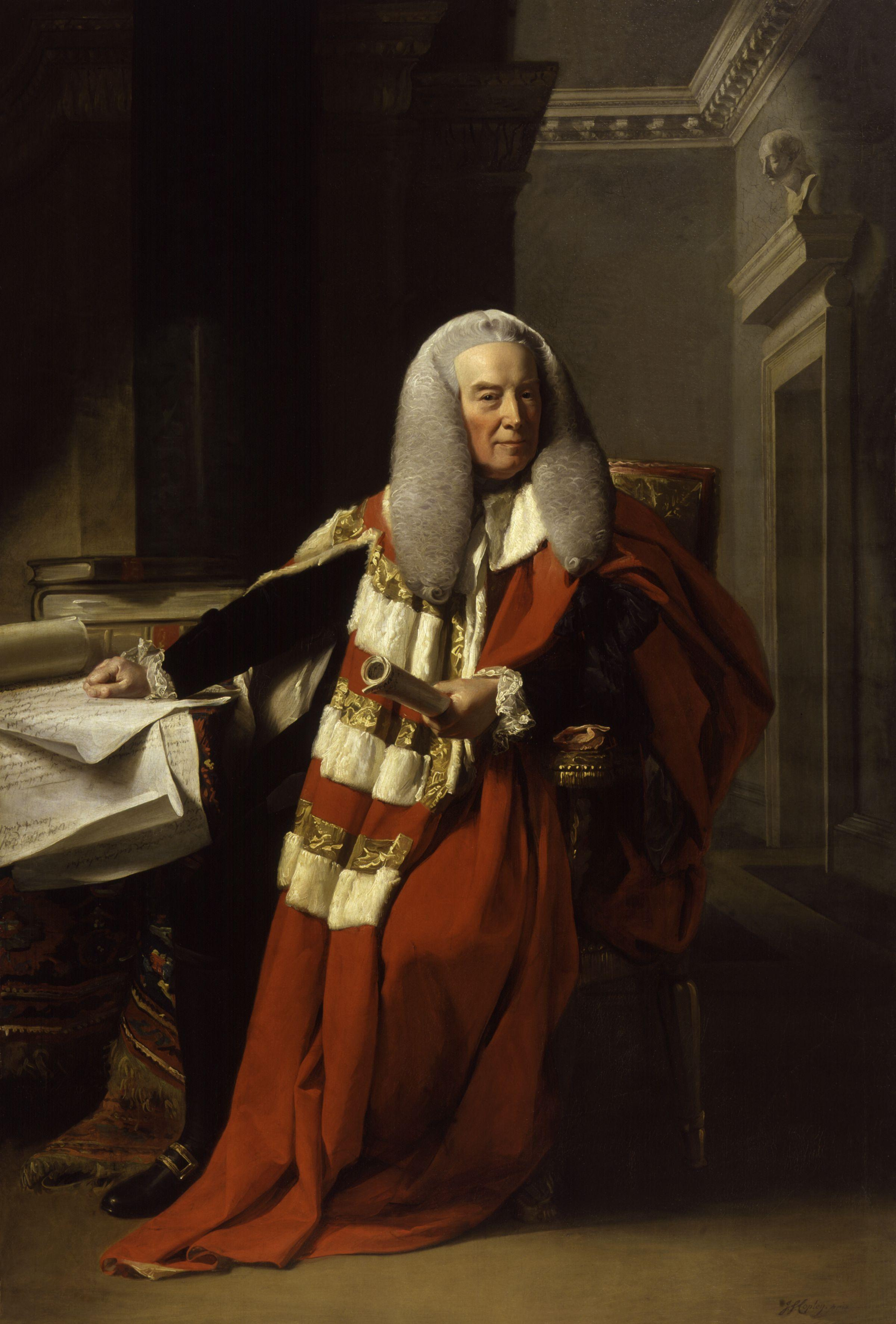
Portrait of Lord Mansfield by John Singleton Copley, 1783. William Murray, 1st Earl of Mansfield, Dido Elizabeth Belle's great uncle and de facto guardian

The Earl and Countess of Mansfield lived at Kenwood House in Hampstead, just outside the City of London. Childless, they were already raising their motherless great-niece, Lady Elizabeth Murray, born in 1760. It is possible that the Mansfields took Belle in to be Lady Elizabeth's playmate and, later in life, her personal attendant. As a result, Belle was baptised eight months after Lady Elizabeth's arrival. Her role within the family suggests that Belle became more that of a lady's companion than a lady's maid.

At Kenwood House, Belle worked in the dairy and poultry yard and as an amanuensis for Lord Mansfield in his later years.

Belle lived at Kenwood House for 31 years. Her position was unusual because she had been born into slavery according to colonial law. Lord and Lady Mansfield treated her well and brought her up as an educated woman. As she grew older, she often assisted Mansfield by taking dictation of his letters, which showed she had been educated.

One of Mansfield's friends, American Thomas Hutchinson, a former governor of Massachusetts who as a Loyalist had moved to London, recalled in his personal diary a visit to Kenwood in 1779 that Belle "was called upon by my Lord every minute for this thing and that, and showed the greatest attention to everything he said". He described her as "neither handsome nor genteel – pert enough".

He also talked about his first impressions of her at Lord Mansfield's house, saying, "A Black came in after dinner and sat with the ladies, and after coffee, walked with the company in the gardens, one of the young ladies having her arm within the other. She had a very high cap, and her wool was much frizzled in her neck, but not enough to answer the large curls now in fashion. I knew her history before, but my Lord mentioned it again. Sir Lindsay, having taken her mother prisoner in a Spanish vessel, brought her to England, where she delivered of this girl, of which she was then with child, and which was taken care of by Lord M., and has been educated by his family. He calls her Dido, which I suppose is all the name she has. He knows he has been reproached for showing a fondness for her – I dare say not criminal".

From Lord Mansfield's statement to Hutchinson, Mansfield seemed to have disguised the fact that Belle was his own great niece from the Governor, which created an implication that Hutchinson thought she was Mansfield's mistress. Such a relationship would have been common in the West Indies as his diary implied "I dare say not criminal".

A brief reference to Belle occurs in volume II of James Beattie's Elements of Moral Science. Beattie refers to her intelligence, saying "But I happened, a few days after, to see his theory overturned, and my conjecture established by a negro girl about ten years old, who had been six years in England, and not only spoke with the articulation and accent of a native, but repeated some pieces of poetry, with a degree of elegance, which would have been admired in any English child of her years." Following this is a footnote which states, "She was in Lord Mansfield's family; and at his desire, and in his presence, repeated those pieces of poetry to me. She was called Dido, and I believe is still alive." This and the quotations from Thomas Hutchinson are some of the few direct references to Belle found in primary source material. However, neither Beattie nor Hutchinson were aware of Belle's familial ties to Lord Mansfield.

Lord Mansfield ruled on a related matter of the status of slaves in England in his capacity as Lord Chief Justice of England and Wales. When called on in 1772 to judge Somerset v Stewart, the case of an escaped slave whose owner wanted to send him back to the West Indies for sale, Mansfield tried hard to prevent the case coming to trial; Mansfield also suggested to Somerset's abolitionist protectors to buy him from Stewart, but they refused. The case went for trial, and he decreed:

The state of slavery is of such a nature, that it is incapable of being introduced on any reasons, moral or political; but only positive law, which preserves its force long after the reasons, occasion, and time itself from whence it was created, is erased from memory: it's so odious, that nothing can be suffered to support it but positive law. Whatever inconveniences, therefore, may follow from a decision, I cannot say this case is allowed or approved by the law of England; and therefore, the black must be discharged.

Mansfield ruled that slavery did not exist in common law and had never been introduced by positive law. He later said his decision was intended only to apply to the slave at issue in the case. Mansfield's ruling may have warned some slave owners to not bring their slaves to England, but it did not stop slavery in the colonies. Later his ruling was used by the abolitionists to argue that slavery was abolished in England.

At the time, it was suggested that Mansfield's personal experience with raising Dido Belle influenced his decision. Thomas Hutchinson later recalled a comment by a slave-owner: "A few years ago there was a cause before his Lordship brought by a Black for recovery of his liberty. A Jamaican planter, being asked what judgment his Lordship would give, answered] 'No doubt ... he will be set free, for Lord Mansfield keeps a Black in his house which governs him and the whole family.'"

=== Social position ===
The notion of a biracial child born in this era to be raised as part of an aristocratic British family was virtually unheard of, and the social conventions of Mansfield's household are somewhat unclear. A 2007 exhibit at Kenwood suggests that Belle's African origins may have played a part in the disparity, yet it was also usual to treat illegitimate children as lesser family, therefore she was not permitted to dine in with guests, as was reported by Thomas Hutchinson. He said Belle joined the ladies afterwards for coffee in the drawing-room. In 2014, author Paula Byrne wrote that Belle's exclusion from this particular dinner was pragmatic rather than the custom. She notes that other aspects of Belle's life, such as being given expensive medical treatments and luxurious bedroom furnishings, were evidence of her position as Lady Elizabeth's equal at Kenwood.

As Belle grew older, she took on the responsibility of managing the dairy and poultry yards at Kenwood. This was a typical occupation for ladies of the gentry, but helping her uncle with his correspondence was less usual. This was normally done by a male secretary or a clerk. However, Elizabeth was never recorded managing dairy or poultry yards. Thomas Hutchinson also remarked on Belle's position in 1779 "She is a sort of Superintendent over the dairy, poultry yard, &c., which we visited, and she was called upon by my Lord every minute for this thing and that, and shewed the greatest attention to everything he said."

Although Lady Elizabeth attended Royal balls and parties with her father, Belle apparently was not allowed to attend. Belle was even absent from the ball thrown by Elizabeth's stepmother in 1782. Lord Mansfield would also take Elizabeth riding with him to visit their neighbours, as noted by Mrs. Boscawen, but not Belle.

Belle was also given an annual allowance of £20, plus an additional £5 for her birthday and Christmas. By contrast, Lady Elizabeth received £100, not including her birthday and other gifts, as the only surviving account book started just as Lady Elizabeth was leaving to be married, but Lady Elizabeth was an heiress in her own right through her mother's aristocratic family. Belle, quite apart from her race, was illegitimate, in a time and place when great social stigma usually accompanied such status. Belle's allowance was also given quarterly which means she received £5 every three months, while Lady Elizabeth received £50 every 6 months; this would have further limited Belle's purchasing power compared to Elizabeth's at any given time.

For comparison, the annual wage of a female domestic worker holding the position of a housekeeper in a high-status household ranged from £20 to £70 at that time, while a lieutenant in the Royal Navy would draw about £100 a year. About £200 purchased a 3-bedroom house with garden outside the city of London.

In Lord Mansfield's will written and directed by himself, Mansfield did not acknowledge Belle as his niece; by contrast, he referred to Lady Elizabeth, Lady Anne, and Lady Margery Murray all as his nieces.

==== Other contemporary accounts ====
Mary Hamilton (1756–1816), diarist, served Queen Charlotte as royal governess. She wrote in her diary that in spring 1784, her first cousin Lady Stormont and her stepdaughter Lady Elizabeth were invited to a royal ball at Carlton house by The Prince of Wales. Evidently, Belle was not invited to the ball. Throughout Hamilton's diary, she never once mentioned Belle, despite her numerous visits to Kenwood, in which she had described all members of the Murray family, including Lady Elizabeth, Elizabeth's three half siblings, two unmarried aunts, old Lord Mansfield, even the parish priest. Dido was apparently excluded from excursions to church, tours of Kenwood, and other family outings that were attended by Hamilton, which seems to consolidate Belle's awkward position in the household.

Lady Mansfield's lifelong friends, Mrs. Boscawen and Mary Delany, both prominent members of the Blue Stockings Society, wrote frequently to each other about the news of the Mansfield family, ranging from Lord Mansfield's health to Lady Elizabeth's marriage. Mrs. Boscawen visited Kenwood in 1782 and said, "Kenwood, where I am always received in kindness. My Lord has gone to London; but my lady and 3 Miss Murrays made me almost forget to go home". They too never mentioned Belle.

== Later life ==
Lady Mansfield died on 10 April 1784 after a long illness; thus Elizabeth's two aunts, Lady Anne and Lady Margery, took charge of the household accounts.

On 15 December 1785, Lady Elizabeth married George Finch Hatton, a rich aristocratic gentleman, Lady Mansfield's nephew and heir to Earl of Winchilsea and Earl of Nottingham after his unmarried first cousin. Their wedding was witnessed by Lord Stormont and Lord Mansfield. Elizabeth, Belle's companion all their young lives, thus left Kenwood at the age of 25 and began her married life between her husband's two vast estates Kirby Hall and Eastwell Park.

Belle's father died in 1788 without legitimate heirs, bequeathing £1,000 to be shared by his "reputed children", John and Elizabeth Lindsay (as noted in his will) and nothing for Belle. Overwhelming sources said that the Elizabeth named in his will was his other illegitimate daughter called Elizabeth Lindsay later Palmer (born c. 1765), who lived in Scotland. Elizabeth Palmer and her half brother John Lindsay were known to keep in contact.

Belle's legal status while Lord Mansfield was alive is uncertain. In his will, written in 1783 and published in 1793, Lord Mansfield officially confirmed or conferred Belle's freedom, but unlike Lady Elizabeth, he did not refer to Belle as his niece. To secure her future after his death, he bequeathed to her £500 as an outright sum and a £100 annuity. In 1799, Belle also inherited £100 from Lady Margery Murray, one of two unmarried aunts who had previously come to live with and help care for the Murrays in their later years.

Lord Mansfield left his niece Lady Elizabeth Murray £10,000. Her father was in line to inherit his uncle's title and entire wealth; he further gave Elizabeth £7,000 more.

Initially in the original 1782 will of Lord Mansfield, he only intended Belle to receive the £100 annuity, but later decided to add £200 and another £300 resulting in £500, saying: "I give Dido the sum of two hundred pounds to set out with .. I think it right considering how she has been bred and how she has behaved to make a better provision for Dido". Lady Elizabeth was always intended to get £10,000; he also added to Eliza's two aunts' inheritances resulting in £22,000 and £1,000 annuity for their life. As a judge, Mansfield was well aware that Eliza would eventually inherit the wealth of her two aunts, making Lady Elizabeth's total inheritance around £40,000.

After Lord Mansfield's death in March 1793, Belle, now aged 32, married Jean Louis Charles Davinière, aged 25 (anglicized to John Davinier) on 5 December 1793 at St George's, Hanover Square. Their wedding was witnessed by John Coventry and Martha Darnell (a dairy maid from Kenwood). Belle's husband was a French servant from Ducey in Normandy. His date of birth is unknown, but he was baptised on 16 November 1768; assuming this happened shortly after birth, he was seven years younger than his wife. He had left France for England towards the end of the 1780s and found work as valet or steward, the terminology of his occupation varies on different sources, but his employer John ('Fish') Craufurd died in 1814, and in his will, he referred to John Davinière as "his valet". They were both then residents of the parish. The Daviniers had at least three sons: twins Charles and John, both baptised at St George's on 8 May 1795; and then William Thomas, baptised there on 26 January 1802. The six year gap period between pregnancies suggests she might have been unwell. During her time at Kenwood, she was known to receive expensive medical care.

Belle and her husband resided at 14 Ranelagh Street North, Pimlico (which at the time was on the outskirts of London). Their house had two rooms on each floor and a garden. Belle's £100 a year would have been enough for a small house outside of London, but not for a female servant. They lived among the working class like gardeners, bakers, clock makers, barbers, and butchers.

Belle died in 1804 at the age of 43, and was interred in July of that year at St George's Fields, Westminster, a burial ground close to what is now Bayswater Road. In the 1970s, the site was redeveloped, and her grave was moved. After her death, her husband had two children with Jane Holland, a white woman 21 years Dido's junior, whom he later married.

== Ancestry ==
Ancestors of Dido Elizabeth Belle

8. Sir Alexander Lindsay, 2nd Baronet
4. Sir Alexander Lindsay, 3rd Baronet
2. John Lindsay
10. David Murray, 5th Viscount of Stormont
5. Amelia Murray
11. Marjory Scott
1. Dido Elizabeth Belle
3. Maria Belle

== Descendants ==
Two of Belle's sons, William Thomas and Charles, were employed by the East India Company: William in England, and Charles in India. Presumably, both of them had enjoyed a private school education in their childhood, with tuition in English, Greek, Latin, French, accounting, land surveying, mathematics and drawing. In 1823, Susan Douse, wife of one of the Kenwood servants, left Belle's son William a miniature portrait of Lord Mansfield in her will, suggesting Belle kept in contact with some Kenwood servants.

Charles Davinière joined the army in 1811 and initially served as ensign with the Madras Army (one of the territorial armies of the East India Company (HEIC), preceding the British Indian Army). He was assigned to the 15th Madras Native Infantry (MNI) and later to the 30th MNI (which was formed from the 2nd Battalion, 15th MNI, in 1824). He was promoted to lieutenant in 1817 and captain in 1827. In August 1837, he was "to have charge of Infantry recruits" in the headquarters at Fort St. George. Becoming major in 1841, Davinière retired on health grounds in 1845 or 1847, still serving then with the 30th MNI. Nonetheless, he was promoted one more time, to lieutenant colonel of the Madras Infantry, in 1855. The reason seems unclear; possibly he was reactivated for an unknown number of years.

Charles Davinière married Hannah Nash, the youngest daughter of J. Nash, Esquire of Kensington, at Kensington Church in August 1836. After his (final) retirement, Charles lived with his wife, children, and servants at Lansdowne Villas in Notting Hill, where he died on 24 January 1873.

William Thomas Davinière married a widow, Fanny Graham, and had a daughter, Emily. Emily died unmarried in 1870, several years after the death of her parents.

Belle's last known descendant was her great-great-grandson, Harold Davinier [sic], a motor mechanic who died childless and left an estate of £250 in South Africa in 1975.

== Representation in media ==
=== 18th-century portrait painting ===
The family commissioned British artist David Martin to paint a double portrait of Belle and her cousin, Lady Elizabeth Murray, completed in 1778.

According to Historic England, the painting is "unique in British art of the 18th century in depicting a black woman and a white woman as near equals".

The 2013 film Belle (see below) drew inspiration from the painting.

- The painting features as the modern cover of The Woman of Colour, an anonymously written 1808 novel about a mixed-race heiress named Olivia and her black slave Dido.

=== Film, music, plays ===
- Dido Belle (2006), a film by Jason Young, was written as a short period drama titled Kenwood House. It was workshopped at Battersea Arts Centre on 21 June 2006 as part of the Battersea Writers' Group script development programme.
- Shirley J. Thompson's operatic trilogy, Spirit Songs – including Spirit of the Middle Passage about Dido Elizabeth Belle, with Abigail Kelly in the role – was performed with the Philharmonia Orchestra at London's Queen Elizabeth Hall, Southbank Centre, in March 2007 as part of the 200-year commemoration of the act abolishing the Atlantic slave trade.
- An African Cargo by Margaret Busby, a play staged by Black Theatre Co-operative (now NitroBeat) featuring actor Jeffery Kissoon at Greenwich Theatre, 2007, in commemoration of the bicentenary of the Abolition of the Slave Trade Act, deals with a landmark 1783 trial presided over by Lord Mansfield at the Guildhall, resulting from the Zong massacre. The character of Dido Belle expresses to the audience feelings of horror and injustice for the murder of the slaves on the ship.
- Let Justice Be Done by Suchitra Chatterjee and Maureen Hicks, a play put on by the Mixed Blessings Theatre Group was premiered at the 2008 Brighton Fringe and explored the influence that Dido Belle might have had on her great-uncle's Somersett Ruling of 1772.
- Belle (2013), a highly fictionalised feature film directed by Amma Asante, explores Dido's life as the multiracial natural daughter of an aristocrat in 18th-century England, who became an heiress but occupied an ambiguous social position. The film is based on the 1779 painting of Dido and her cousin Elizabeth. The film stars Gugu Mbatha-Raw as Dido and Tom Wilkinson as her guardian Lord Mansfield.
- Fern Meets Dido (2018), A musical written by Evadne Bygrave based on the book Fern and Kate Meet Dido Elizabeth Belle by David Gleave. The story of a modern-day young biracial girl, disaffected at school and uncertain about her identity. On a school trip to Kenwood House, something magical happens, and she goes back in time and meets Dido.
- I, Dido (2018), a three-handed play by Non Vaughan-O'Hagan was commissioned by St George's Bloomsbury where Dido was baptised. The play explores the relationship between Dido, Lord Mansfield and Lady Betty. Act I takes place on the night of 6 June 1780, when the Mansfields' home in Bloomsbury Square was destroyed in the Gordon Riots. Act II takes place in Kenwood House six years later, after the death of Lady Betty. The play has also been adapted as a short film of the same name, directed by Penelope Shales-Slyne.
- The character of Katherine "Kitty" Higham is inspired by Dido in the BBC TV series Ghosts.

=== Novels ===
- Family Likeness, a 2013 novel by Caitlin Davies, was inspired in part by the life of Dido Elizabeth Belle.
- Author Paula Byrne was commissioned to write Belle: The True Story of Dido Belle (2014) as a tie-in to the 2013 film Belle. It was published in paperback and as an audiobook when the movie opened in the United States.
- Zadie Smith mentions the story of Belle in her 2016 novel Swing Time when the narrator goes to Kenwood House and overhears a tour guide talking about her.
- The short-story collection The Woman Who Gave Birth to Rabbits, by Emma Donoghue, contains a short story called "Dido", about Dido Elizabeth Belle.
- Dangerous Freedom, a 2021 historical novel about Dido Belle by Lawrence Scott, the story was largely spun from a lot of known facts about Dido Elizabeth Belle.
- Dido Elizabeth Belle features as one of the two central characters in The Lizzie and Belle Mysteries: Drama and Danger by children's author J.T. Williams, published in 2022. This is the first of series of historical novels set in eighteenth century London, anchored around the imagined friendship of Dido Belle with Elizabeth "Lizzie" Sancho, daughter of Ignatius Sancho.
