= Frieda Arnold =

British courtier

Frieda Arnold (fl. 1854 – fl. 1859), was a British courtier. She was a dresser (lady's maid) to Queen Victoria between 1854 and 1859. She is known for her correspondence, which gives a valuable historic insight in the life of Queen Victoria's household, and is one of few published of a queen's dresser.

== Life and career ==
Frieda Arnold was born in a middle class family in Germany. After the death of her father, she trained as a seamstress and supported herself as a lady's maid. In 1854, she was employed as a Dresser in the chamber staff of Queen Victoria, the Department of the Mistress of the Robes. Victoria had four ladies maids with the title Dresser as well as a group chamber maids who slept in a room close to her, and reportedly had a closer relationship to them than to her aristocratic staff, who were more often temporary and whom she normally had a more distant relationship to. Arnold was employed as a Dresser under the First Dresser or Principle Dresser Marianne Skerrett, and was described as a well educated and intelligent woman. She left the Queen's employment upon her marriage to the photographer Ernst Müller.

== Legacy ==
Her correspondence has been preserved and published. As a member of the chamber staff, she was more well informed about the private life of the queen than the rest of the royal household and court, particularly since the royal family privately spoke to each other in German; she did, however, keep her promise not to discuss the private life of the royal family in her correspondence. Her letters nevertheless gives an intimate picture and details of the everyday life of the royal family and the court. She describes her longing home to Germany, her despair of the cold climate and soot in London, and describe the inner royal household with a good eye for details.
