= St George's Fields (disambiguation) =

St George's Fields was an area of Southwark

St George's Fields may also refer to:

- St George's Fields, Westminster, former cemetery in Bayswater
- Woodhouse Cemetery or St George's Fields, former cemetery in Leeds
