= Annie MacDonald =

British courtier (1832–1897)

Annie MacDonald née Mitchell (1832–1897), was a British courtier. She was a Dresser (lady's maid) to Queen Victoria between 1862 and 1897.

== Life ==
She was born near Balmoral Castle in Scotland. She married the butler John McDonald (d. 1865) in 1863. Initially a washer woman of prince Albert, she was employed by the queen in 1862. She was the Principal Dresser and as such outranked and supervised the Second and Third Dresser and the Wardrobe Maids, all part of the Department of the Mistress of the Robes.

She was responsible for the organization of the queen's chamber staff, handling the contacts with tradespeople and artists, making orders and paying them and answering beggar letters. She was a personal friend of queen Victoria and replaced Marianne Skerrett as the queen's confidante when Skerrett retired in 1862. As such she had an important position in the royal household, as the queen was generally closer to her chamber staff than to her ladies-in-waiting, to whom she normally had a less personal attitude. When Victoria died, she was noted to say, that she hoped to be reunited with John Brown and Annie MacDonald.

She received the Queen Victoria Version of the Royal Household Long and Faithful Service Medal in 1892 'for faithful services to the Queen during 38 years'.

== Legacy ==
She is known and often mentioned in Victoria's letters, Queen Victoria's journals and Queen Victoria's Highland Journals.
