= Pepa Pollet =

Pepa Pollet (fl. 1870), was a French courtier. She was the principal lady's maid and treasurer to the empress of France, Eugénie de Montijo. She was a controversial figure as the personal favorite and influential confidante of the empress, and sometimes accused of misusing her influence.

== Life ==
She was the daughter of the Carlist general Narro de Ortega. She was employed as the lady's maid to Eugenie before her marriage to the emperor, and remained in her employ all her life. She married a Colonel Pollet.

=== Position at court ===
When Eugenie married Napoleon III in 1853, Pollet was appointed treasurer to the empress. She was the only Spaniard employed by the Spanish-born empress. She was the intermediary between the empress and the tradesmen, and responsible for all her expenditure. She guarded Eugenies' jewels and supervised her dressing. She was responsible for everything concerning Eugenies personal household and female staff.

=== Personality and controversy ===
Pollet was described as a diminutive and pale woman with bad health, timid but irritable temper and with a strong Spanish accent, who was fiercely loyal to the empress. She was ridiculed and exposed to some hostility because her influence on the empress, but Eugenie always defended her. Her temperament often caused quarrels and domestic disputes among the staff, but Eugenie was so devoted to her that she accepted to have to mediate in these disputes. Despite her influence, Pollet was not known to have used it for political gain, as Eugenie refused any of her female staff to speak with her of politics. She was accused of abusing her position for her personal gain. She reportedly used her connections with the tradesmen of the empress to amass a fortune of two million franc.

=== Later life and death ===
She accompanied Eugenie to England after the fall of the Third Empire in 1870. However, the English climate was not good for her health, so she returned to France, where she died not long after her arrival.
