= Nicole du Hausset =

French memoirist

Nicole du Hausset or Du Haussay née Collesson (14 July 1713 – 24 July 1801), was a French memoirist. She was the lady's maid (femme de chambre) and personal confidante of Madame de Pompadour.

== Life ==
She was employed as a "second femme de chambre" to Madame de Pompadour in 1747, shortly after Pompadours introduction to the royal court as the mistress of king Louis XV. She was an acquaintance from before Pompadour became a royal mistress. Nicole du Hausset was the poor but well connected widow of a nobleman, and was expected to be of use to Pompadour's adjustment at the royal court. She belonged to the circle of doctor François Quesnay.

While her employment as lady's maid formally made her a servant, her status as a member of nobility placed her in a different situation, as she herself expressed: "I was for a long time about the person of Madame de Pompadour, and my birth procured for me respectful treatment from herself, and from some distinguished persons who conceived a regard for me." She is described as loyal and dutiful, and played an important role at court as the intermediary between the influential Madame de Pompadour and her many supplicants.

She is known for her famous memoirs, describing her time at the French court, which were first published in 1824 and considered a valuable source of the life of Madame de Pompadour.
