= Abigail Kelly =

English soprano opera singer

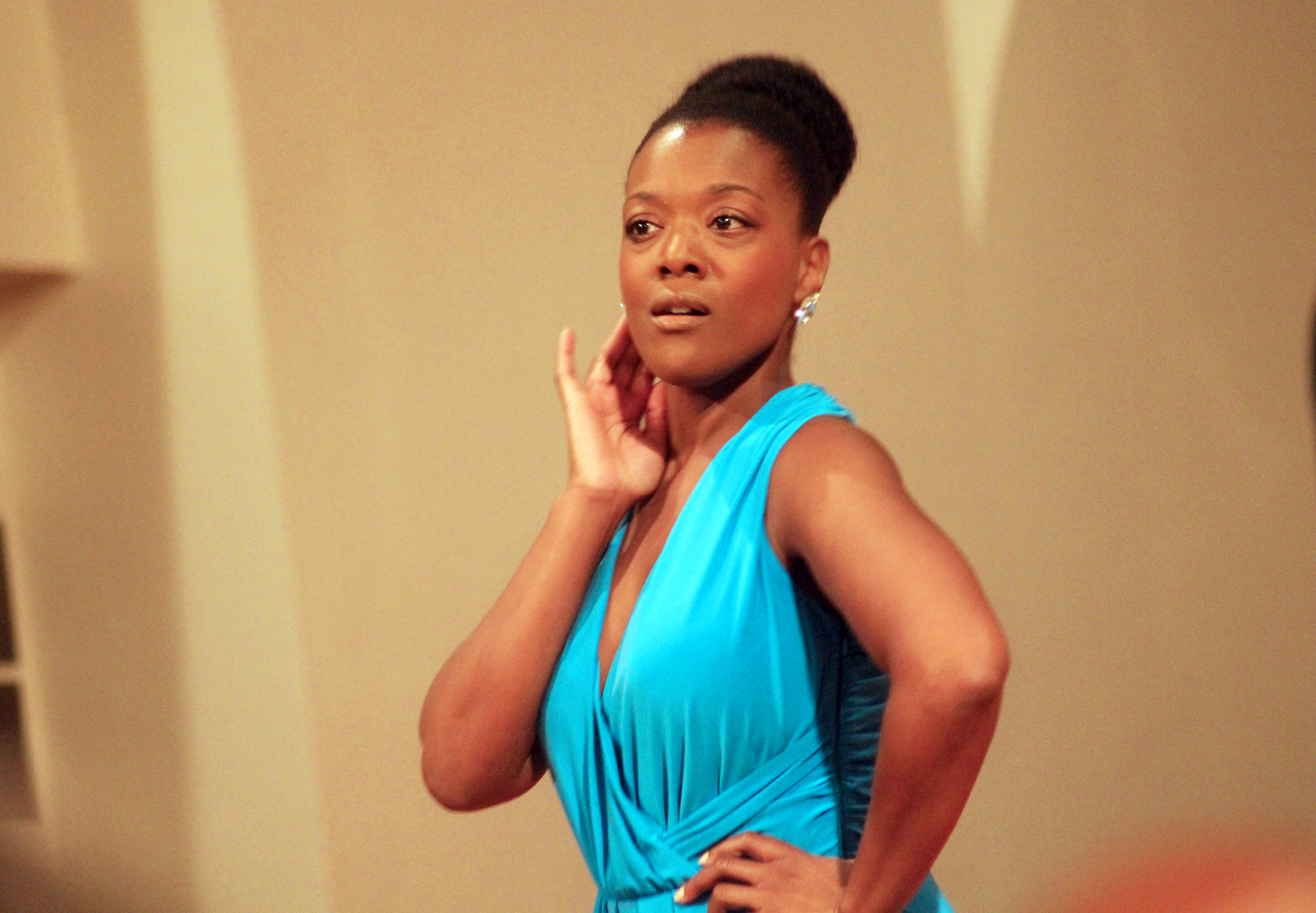
- Born: Birmingham, U.K.
- Occupation(s): Opera singer (soprano), voice teacher/vocal coach/actress
- Years active: 2006–present
- Website: http://www.abigailkellysoprano.com

Abigail Kelly is an English soprano opera and concert singer.

== Early life and education ==
Kelly was raised in Birmingham, England. She had an interest in the performing arts from a very young age, and cites her experiences at a dance school in Birmingham as having had a formative impact on her life. She completed her undergraduate studies at Birmingham Conservatoire with a first-class honours degree studying under Maureen Brathwaite. While at the Conservatoire she was awarded "a First Class Bachelor of Music degree, the Robert Gahan Award for achievement by a first-year singer; and the highest marks in her year". Kelly has also won the Leamington Spa Festival's Rae Woodland opera competition, and received additional financial assistance to further her operatic training from the Peter Moores Foundation, English Touring Opera (ETO) and Chris Ball. Following her undergraduate studies, Kelly completed her Post Graduate Diploma course in operatic studies at the Royal Scottish Academy of Music and Drama in Glasgow under the tuition of Helen Lawson.

== Career ==
Kelly's oratorio performances include Mozart's Vespers and Mass in C minor, Haydn's The Creation, John Rutter's Mass of the Children and Handel's Messiah. Her operatic roles include Amour in Rameau's Pygmalion, Helena and Juno in Purcell's The Fairy Queen, and Belinda in Purcell's Dido and Aeneas. Kelly has toured with the British Youth Opera in Italy, France and London, performing in the choruses of La bohème, Don Giovanni and Eugene Onegin.

Kelly has performed with English Touring Opera as Despina in Così fan tutte and as a member of the chorus in Simon Boccanegra, Don Pasquale, Il tabarro, La clemenza di Tito and The Siege of Calais. Also, she has been part of the company's educational programme, "Midnight Moon", and her account of her involvement appears on the ETO's website as well as in the Birmingham Post, where she also describes the experience: "In these kinds of projects I get to connect with the audience in a way that you can't when you're performing an opera on stage....To be able to sing and interact so closely with people with such profound disabilities is a very special thing."

Also with ETO, she sang the role of Fido in Benjamin Britten's Paul Bunyan in February 2014 where one reviewer noted that "in a company show with no weak links every singer deserves praise, though if pressed I'd have to single out Mark Wilde's Johnny Inkslinger, Abigail Kelly's dog Fido and Caryl Hughes". while another stated that: "There was a notably fine, passionate performance from Abigail Kelly as Fido..." and a third, Nick Kimberely in Opera stated that "the stars of this production turn out to be two cats Poppet (Emma Watkinson) and Moppet (Amy J. Payne), and a dog, Fido (Abigail Kelly)".

She is featured in ETO's video production of life on tour.

Her performances in new works include actress/singer soloist in Luca Francesconi's Lips, eyes...bang with the Thallein Ensemble at Birmingham Conservatoire for which she received critical acclaim and Shirley J. Thompson's Spirit of the Middle Passage realizing the role of Dido Elizabeth Belle at Queen Elizabeth Hall with the London Philharmonia. In Richard Chew's Mary Seacole, The Opera, she played the roles of a young Jamaican girl and Mrs Grant, and sang in Mass Carib by Felix Cross as part of the Greenwich and Docklands Festival with Nitro Theatre Company. She was a featured artist during the Bollington Festival 2009, performing the role of Sara in Jonathan Dove's Tobias and the Angel, and the roles of Bess, Clara and Selena in a concert version of Porgy and Bess.

Kelly has also toured internationally performing as a featured artist with Opera South Africa and the Johannesburg Philharmonic Orchestra at the Capital Arts Festival at the South Africa State Theatre. She has performed in Jamaica, Hungary, Montserrat, Grand Cayman, Luxembourg, Poland and toured Germany as part of the Arianna Consort. Kelly also appeared in the role of Susanna in Le nozze di Figaro presented by the Opéra de Baugé in France in Baugé-en-Anjou during the summer 2014 and reprised the role at the Rose Theatre, Kingston upon Thames in November of that year.

In June 2014, Kelly sang at the House of Commons in London during "Birmingham Day".

In March 2017 she performed in Girl Behind The Glass at Midland Arts Centre in Birmingham.

She performed in July 2017 at "They Also Served", honouring Caribbean servicemen in World War I.

In October 2017 Kelly sang in a concert performance of Porgy and Bess by the Crouch End Festival Chorus at the Barbican Centre in London, and she sang Pamina in The Magic Flute in November 2017.

Kelly sang Susanna in The Marriage of Figaro, Theatre Royal, Norwich in May 2018.

In September 2018 Kelly sang spiritual songs at a Birmingham Church Ancestral Celebration Service.

In December 2019 Abiagail was part of an event organised by Birmingham City University's Royal Birmingham Conservatoire and the Royal Opera House entitled "Opera Nation", which was a free programme to develop the next generation of opera singers in the West Midlands region. At the time Abigail said:

"By removing barriers to training, initiatives like Opera Nation empower young people and ensure that every young person, regardless of their background, has access to music and a musical education. Having grown up in Birmingham this project is close to my heart and I look forward to working with young people across the region to mentor and support their futures. Whether those involved go on to be professional singers or take different career paths, this accessible programme provides a wonderful opportunity for young people from across the West Midlands to work with many talented professionals and offer unrivalled insight into the artform."

In May 2020 there was an online feature entitled "Sing like an opera singer with English Touring Opera". Participants were able to learn skills and techniques from Spring 2020 opera singers during this series of singing lessons.

Kelly was on BBC Radio 3's The Essay, Culture in Quarantine: Sounds of Silence, which was aired on Broadcast on Tuesday 18 August 2020.

Abigail Kelly did an online Masterclass as part of the Hackney Choral Summer Course in July 2020.

The Royal Albert Hall presented "Royal Albert Home: Opera for Kids by Abigail Kelly" on Saturday, 15 August 2020. In August 2020, English Touring Opera did an online feature "In Conversation with Abigail Kelly, Maciek O'Shea and Omar Shahryar".
