= Marie von Flotow =

Russian courtier (1817–1909)

Marie von Flotow (Nyborg, Denmark, 18 Augusti 1817 - 1909, Vitebsk, Russia) was a Russian courtier, the lady's maid and influential favorite of the Russian empress Maria Feodorovna.

Marie von Flotow was born in Denmark to the German nobleman Peter von Gerschau and Karoline Henriette Schmidt. She married Bernhard Friedrich von Flotow.

She served for a period in the household of Louise of Hesse-Kassel, before she was employed in the household of Louise's daughter Princess Dagmar, who married the future tsar Alexander III of Russia in 1866 and became empress in 1881.

Marie von Flotow was technically a lady's maid, with the responsibility of her jewels and wardrobe and the payment of her bills. In addition to her formal position, however, she was also the confidante of Marie Feodorovna, which gave her a great deal of influence at the imperial court and gave her a position of "paramount influence". She kept this position also after Maria Feodorovna became a widow.

The influence of Marie von Flotow during the reign of tsar Nicholas II is described by Aleksandr Mosolov Methuen (where she is incorrectly referred to as a lady-in-waiting):

"Marie Feodorovna could not refuse anything to the members of her suite.. And Nicholas II agreed to everything that his mother asked. The consequence was that most of the appointments at Court were made through the channel of the Empress Dowager's Court. She had a Lady in Waiting, Mme Flotow. This lady was officially responsible for the care of her mistress's jewels and wardrobe; but she had succeeded in gaining a position of altogether extravagant influence. As soon as the name of Mme Flotow was to be found in the papers of an applicant it was a foregone conclusion that the Tsar would grant the request, even if at first he was for rejecting it. Somehow, I do not know how, Mme Flotow would know all about the Sovereign's decisions, at times well before the writer of these pages!"

== Sources ==
- Hall, Coryne, Little Mother of Russia: A Biography of Empress Marie Feodorovna, ISBN 978-0-8419-1421-6
- Russian Court Memoirs, 1914-16, with some account of court, social and political life in Petrograd before and since the war
- Aleksandr Mosolov Methuen; At the court of the last tsar: being the memoirs of A. A. Mossolov, head of the court chancellery, 1900-1916
- "Nicholas II - At the Court of the Last Tsar - Chapter II, The Dowager Empress and the Grand Dukes". alexanderpalace.org.
