= Marianne Skerrett =

Dresser to Queen Victoria (1793–1887)

- Chalk portrait by Rosa Koberwein, 1880.

Principal Dresser to Her Majesty The Queen
- In office 1837–1862
- Monarch: Victoria
- Succeeded by: Annie MacDonald

Personal details
- Born: 20 June 1793 London, England
- Died: 29 July 1887 (aged 94) Marylebone, London, England

Marianne Skerrett (20 June 1793 – 29 July 1887) was a British courtier. She was a Dresser (lady's maid) to Queen Victoria between 1837 and 1862.

== Biography ==
She was born in London to Walter Frye Skerrett and Albinia Mathias Skerrett. She was employed by the queen after her accession to the throne in 1837. She was the Principal Dresser and, as such, outranked and supervised the Second and Third Dresser and the Wardrobe Maids, all part of the Department of the Mistress of the Robes.

She was responsible for the organization of the queen's chamber staff, handling the contacts with tradespeople and artists, making orders and paying them and answering begging letters. She was a personal friend of Queen Victoria and replaced Louise, Baroness Lehzen as the queen's confidante when Lehzen left Britain in 1842. As such, she had an important position in the royal household, as the queen was generally closer to her chamber staff than to her ladies-in-waiting, with whom she normally had a less personal relationship .

Skerrett retired with a pension in 1862 and settled with her sister in London. She was replaced by Annie MacDonald (1832–1897).

Skerrett died on 29 July 1887, at the age of 94. Upon hearing of her former dresser's passing, Queen Victoria wrote in her journal:

"Received the sad news, that my dear faithful old Skerrett, whom I am so distressed I could not visit, had passed away. She came to me at my accession, & was most useful at the head of my Wardrobe, ordering everything, looking over my bills, &c, & arranging with the different artists. She was quite a superior person, very clever, read enormously, had an intense passion for animals, & was a great friend of Landseer's, & of many of the artists. She was very stressed, & plain spoken, most devoted & attached to me & mine. She used to come & see me at Windsor & in London. She was 94, & in full possession of her faculties. It is sad that she too is gone!"

— Queen Victoria, 4 August 1887

== In popular culture ==
The ITV television programme Victoria (2016-2019) features Nell Hudson in a significant supporting role as "Nancy Skerrett," a composite character based broadly on Marianne Skerrett. She differs greatly from the historical figure in numerous matters, including her life dates and marital status.
