= Lady's maid =

Female personal attendant

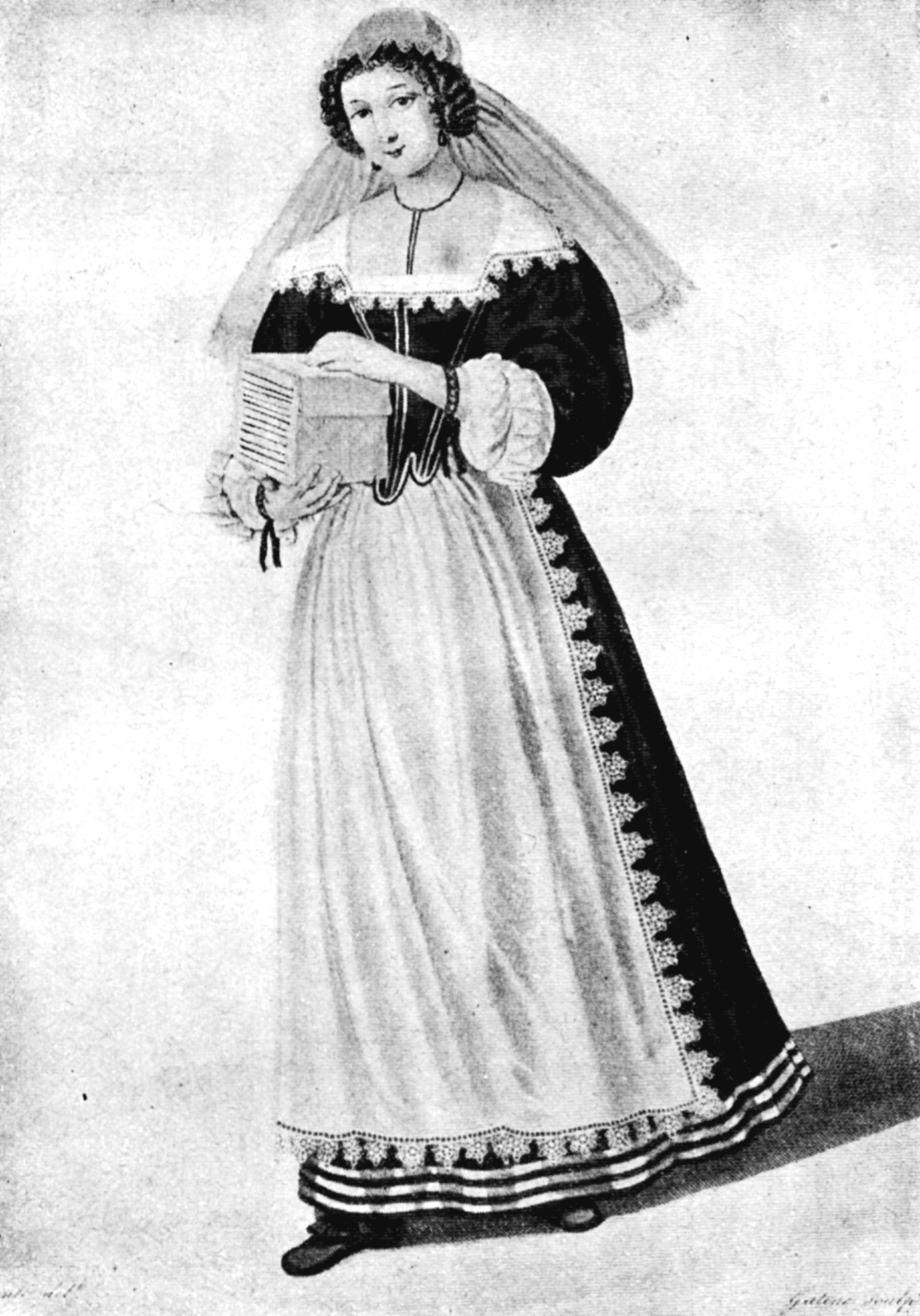
Illustration depicting a Parisian lady's maid in the 1630s. The illustration is made in the turn of the 18th-19th century, by Georges-Jacques Gatine (1773–1848)

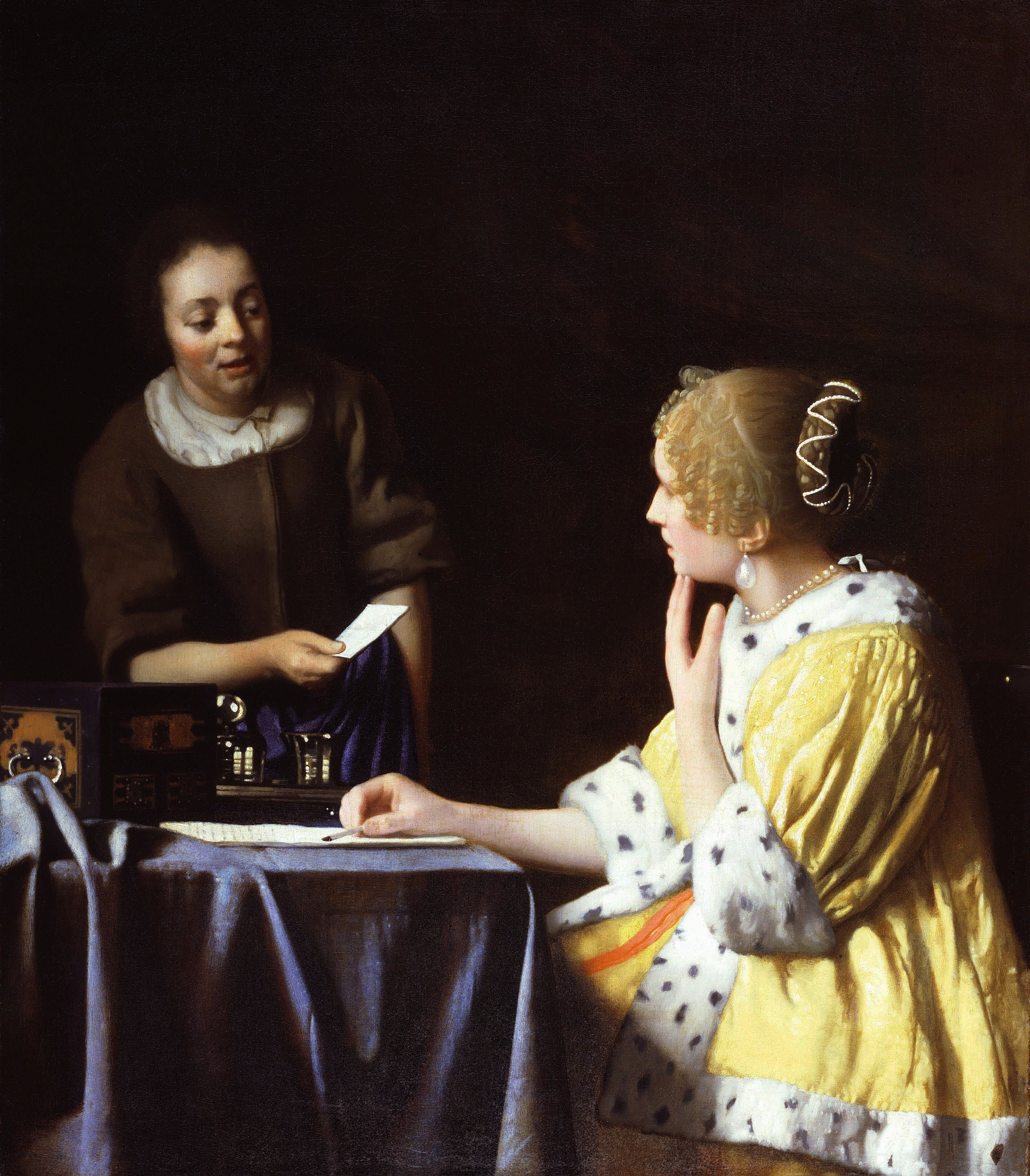
Mistress and Maid by Johannes Vermeer.

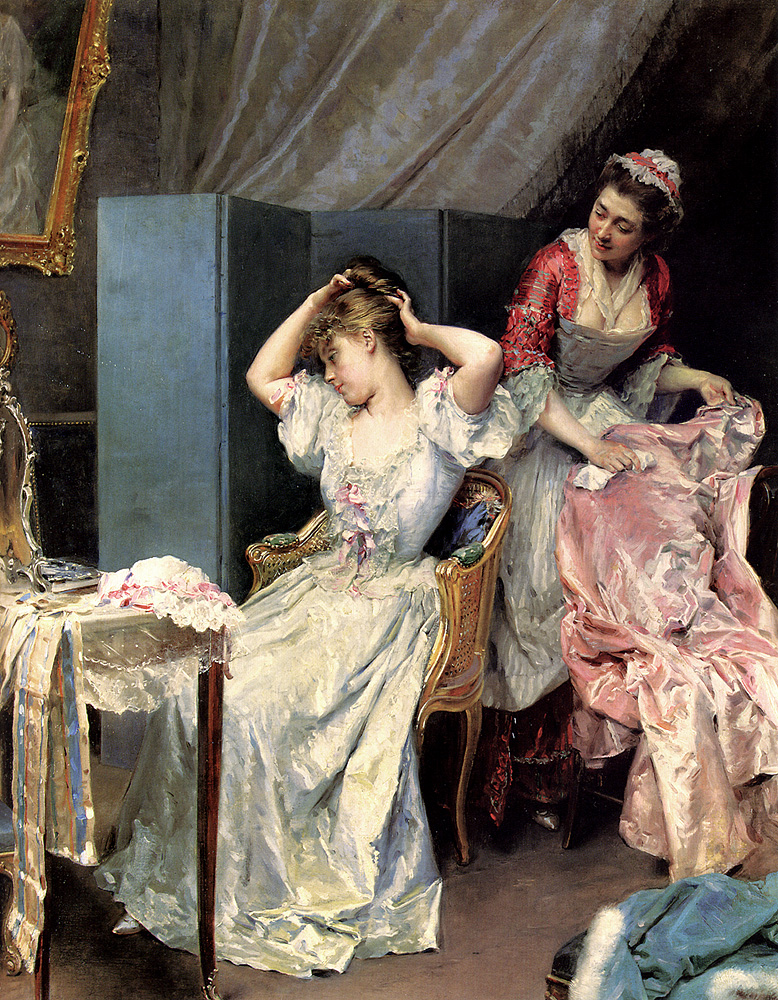
La Toilette by Raimundo de Madrazo y Garreta, c. 1890 – c. 1900

A lady's maid is a female personal attendant who waits on her female employer. The role of a lady's maid is similar to that of a gentleman's valet.

== Description ==
Traditionally, the lady's maid was not as high-ranking as a lady's companion, who was a retainer rather than a servant, but the rewards included room and board, travel and somewhat improved social status. In the servants' hall, a lady's maid took precedence akin to that of her mistress. In Britain, a lady's maid would be addressed by her surname by her employer, while she was addressed as "Miss" by junior servants or when visiting another servants' hall.

A lady's maid's specific duties included helping her mistress with her appearance, including make-up, hairdressing, clothing, jewellery, and shoes. A lady's maid would also remove stains from clothing; sew, mend, and alter garments as needed; bring her mistress breakfast in her room; and draw her mistress's bath. However, she would not be expected to dust and clean every small item, as that would be the job of a housemaid.

== Examples of lady's maids ==
- Catherine Bellier (1614–1689), Première femme de Chambre to the Queen of France, Anne of Austria.
- Maria Molina (17th century), Première femme de Chambre to the Queen of France, Maria Theresa of Spain.
- Juliana Schierberg (d. 1712), lady's maid to princess Hedvig Sophia of Sweden.
- Nicole du Hausset (1713–1801), lady's maid to Madame de Pompadour.
- Juliane von Schwellenberg (1728–1797), lady's maid to Charlotte of Mecklenburg-Strelitz, queen of Great Britain.
- Ingrid Maria Wenner (1731–1793), lady's maid to Sophia Magdalena of Denmark, queen of Sweden.
- Julie Louise Bibault de Misery (1732–1804), Première femme de Chambre to the Queen of France Marie Antoinette.
- Maria Perekusikhina (1739–1824), lady's maid to empress Catherine the Great.
- Jeanne Louise Henriette Campan (1752–1822), Première femme de Chambre to the Queen of France, Marie Antoinette.
- Marianne Skerrett (1793–1887), the principal lady's maid (with the title "Dresser") to Queen Victoria of the United Kingdom between 1837 and 1862.
- Bertha Zück (1797–1868), lady's maid to Josephine of Leuchtenberg, queen of Sweden.
- Frieda Arnold (fl. 1854–fl. 1859), lady's maid to Queen Victoria between 1854 and 1859.
- Pepa Pollet (fl. 1870), lady's maid to Eugénie de Montijo, empress of France.
- Marie von Flotow (1817–1909), the lady's maid and influential favourite of the Russian Empress Maria Feodorovna (Dagmar of Denmark).
- Anna Demidova (1878–1918), lady's maid to Alexandra Feodorovna (Alix of Hesse), tsaritsa of Russia

Notable fictional lady's maids include:

- Dido in The Woman of Colour: A Tale (1808), a mixed-race Jamaican former slave who is lady's maid to the heroine Olivia Fairfield.
- Anna Smith (later Mrs Bates) is lady's maid to Lady Mary Crawley in the TV series Downton Abbey (2010–2015). She is portrayed as loyal and trustworthy, in contrast to Lady Grantham's scheming lady's maid Miss O'Brien.
- Maude Roberts in Upstairs, Downstairs (1971–1975) was lady's maid to Lady Marjorie Bellamy.

== See also ==
- Chamber woman
- Domestic worker
- French maid
- Handmaiden
- Housekeeper
- Maid
- Première femme de Chambre
- Valet
