= The Woman of Colour: A Tale =

1808 epistolary novel

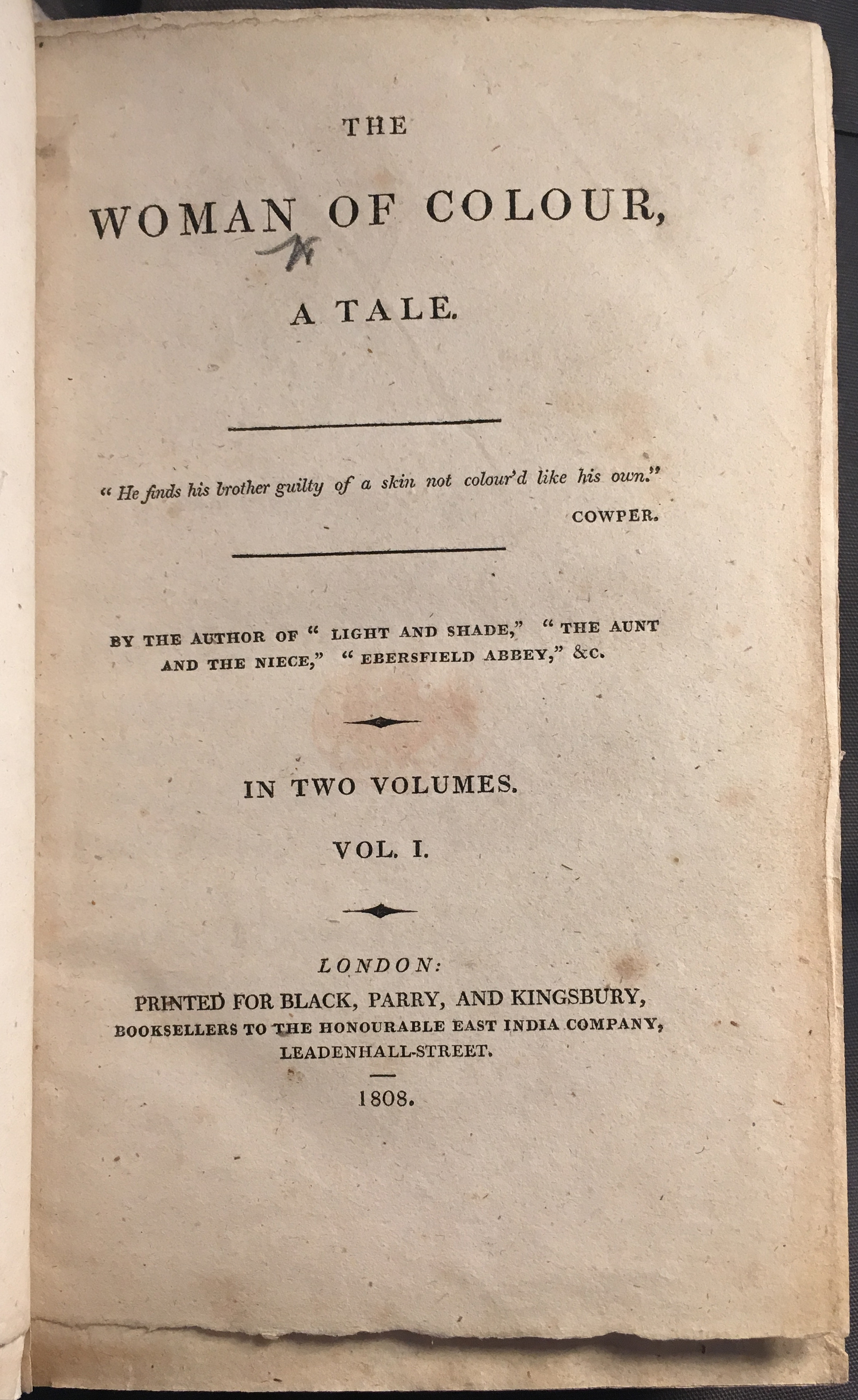
- Publisher: Black, Parry, and Kingsbury
- Publication date: 1808

The Woman of Colour: A Tale is an epistolary novel published anonymously in 1808, about a biracial heiress who travels from Jamaica to England to marry according to the terms of her father's will. The book received moderate praise in three reviews at the time of its publication, but was largely forgotten until a wider interest in women's writing in the period brought it to the attention of scholars; it was brought back into print in 2008. It is now considered an important record in the history of British slavery and abolition, and the history of race, due to its very early depiction of a "racially-conscious mulatto heroine." Substantial research has sought to identify the author of the work, whom some speculate may have been a woman of colour herself, but no consensus has been reached.

== Synopsis ==
The story is told through a series of letters written by the heroine Olivia Fairfield to her former governess, Mrs. Milbanke, in Jamaica. Olivia is the mixed-race illegitimate daughter of an English plantation-owner, Mr. Fairfield, and his slave Marcia, who died in childbirth. Mr. Fairfield has died, and bequeathed his estate (worth £60,000) to his nephew Augustus Merton, on the condition that Augustus must marry Olivia. If Augustus refuses, the estate goes instead to Augustus's already-married elder brother, George Merton.

While en route to England, Olivia befriends her travelling companion Mrs. Honeywood, and attracts the affection of her son Charles Honeywood. On arrival, Olivia falls in love with Augustus, who treats her with reserve. Eventually, he confesses his love and the two are married. However, Augustus actually considers himself unable to love again after the loss of a previous partner. He has married Olivia to spare her the guardianship of his unpleasant brother, and feigned love because she would not otherwise agree.

Olivia establishes herself as mistress of Augustus' country household, meeting various inhabitants of their neighbourhood. A mysterious woman moves in to a small cottage nearby; she is revealed to be Angelina Forrester, whom Augustus embraces as his beloved wife, believed dead. Olivia is devastated to discover that Augustus did not love her. Her marriage is considered null, and George gains the inheritance from Mr. Fairfield. He provides Olivia with an allowance of £200 a year, and she retreats to live in anonymity in a remote cottage. Mr. Honeywood lives nearby, discovers her, and declares his love for her; Olivia rejects him due to her own continued love for Augustus.

In her last letters, Olivia accepts an invitation from Mrs. Milbanke to return to Jamaica, and departs eagerly. A final note from the fictional editor declares that Olivia does not need to be narratively rewarded with a husband, because virtue is its own reward.

== Major themes ==
=== Abolition versus amelioration of slavery ===
The Woman of Colour was published during a major transition in the abolition of British slavery, in which a distinction was drawn between the slave trade (the buying and selling of enslaved persons) and slavery itself (holding an enslaved person as a forced labourer). In 1807, the year before The Woman of Colour was published, the British Slave Trade Act outlawed the buying and selling of slaves within the British Empire. All currently-enslaved people remained enslaved, but a fine of £100 was imposed for every slave found being transported by a British ship for sale. Many activists promoted the full abolition of slavery itself as the natural next step, including the emancipation of current slaves, but others argued that it was only the kidnapping and inhumane shipping conditions of the slave trade which were unacceptable; this second viewpoint proposed various forms of amelioration instead to allow slavery to continue. A key interpretive question about The Woman of Colour is its position within this debates.

== Reception ==
The 1810 edition was reviewed by The British Critic, The Critical Review and The Monthly Review. The Critical Review questioned "the morality of this tale" given that "three worthy characters [are] made wretched for no one reason in the world," while The Monthly Review praised its "useful aim and good principles."
