= St George's Fields, Westminster =

Former cemetery in Westminster, Greater London

Coordinates: 51°30′49″N 000°09′56″W

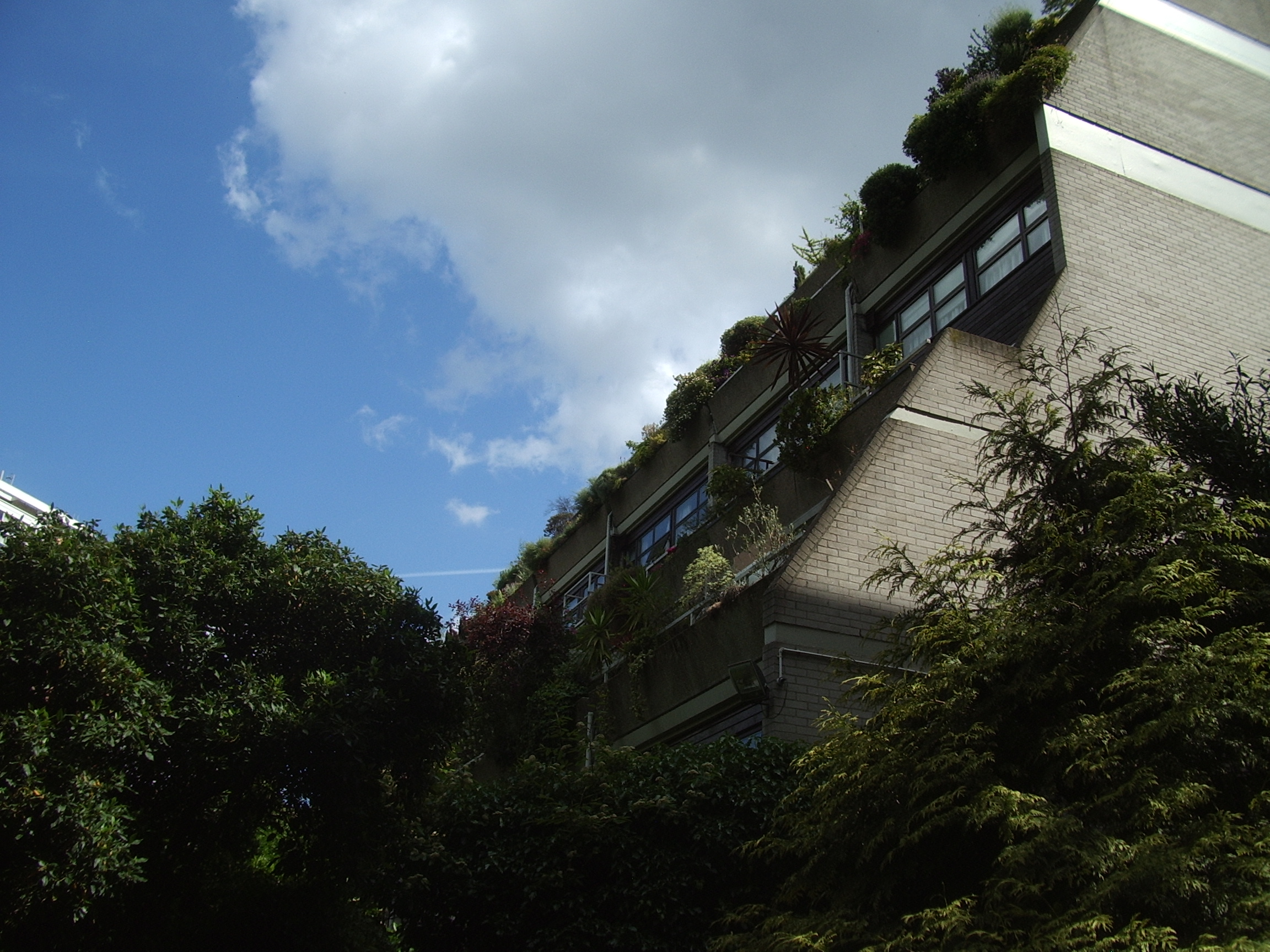
St George's Fields in Bayswater, London. The ziggurat style of building similar to Patrick Hodgkinson's Brunswick is clearly seen.

St George's Fields are a former burial ground of St George's, Hanover Square, lying between Connaught Street and Bayswater Road in Tyburnia deconsecrated and sold off by the Church Commissioners in the 1970s to be built upon by The Utopian Housing Association, a housing trust.

The architects, Design 5, used a ziggurat style of building (similar to the Brunswick Centre by Patrick Hodgkinson), retaining much of the open space whilst creating 300 dwellings. Parts of the double walls surrounding the burial ground - reputedly designed to frustrate grave robbers - have been preserved along with a number of tombstones.

The burial ground was also used for years as an archery ground, hence the nearby Archery Close and one of the new buildings being called Archery Steps.

The estate is now in private ownership although the grounds of St George's Fields are opened to the public once a year under the London Garden Square Scheme when one of London's oldest plane trees, with a girth of over 18 ft (5.5 m), may be seen set amongst the other trees.

Although the buildings on the estate are not listed they have been included within the Bayswater Road Conservation Area established by the City of Westminster to preserve the amenities of this historic area.

Within ten minutes walk is London Paddington station, and the nearest London Underground stations are Marble Arch, Lancaster Gate on the Central line, and Edgware Road station on the Circle, District, and Hammersmith & City lines.

Post Code to look up location on either GPS or a map is W2 2YE.
